= Taaffe =

Taaffe is a surname. Notable people with the surname include:

- Viscount Taaffe (title and family)
- Theobald Taaffe, 1st Earl of Carlingford (died 1677), Irish-born courtier and soldier in England
- Francis Taaffe, 3rd Earl of Carlingford (died 1704), Irish-born courtier and soldier in Lorraine
- Nicholas Taaffe, 6th Viscount Taaffe (1685–1769), Irish-born courtier and soldier in Lorraine and Austria
- Eduard Taaffe, 11th Viscount Taaffe (1833–1895), Prime Minister of Austria
- Elizabeth Murphy Taaffe (1844–1875), American rancher and early settler in Los Altos, California
- Edward J. Taaffe (1921–2001), American geographer
- Henry Taaffe, 12th Viscount Taaffe (1872–1928), last Viscount Taaffe
- Charlie Taaffe (1950–2019), American football coach
- Denis Taaffe (died 1813), Irish political writer, pseudonym Julius Vindex
- Éamonn Taaffe (born 1975), Irish sportsperson
- Ellen Taaffe Zwilich (born 1939), American composer
- Peter Taaffe (1942–2025), British politician
- Philip Taaffe (born 1937), American artist
- Sonya Taaffe, American writer
- Tom Taaffe, Irish horse trainer
- Richard Taaffe, gemmologist and discoverer of taaffeite
- Taaffe O'Connell, American actress
- Olivia Taaffe, founder of St Joseph's Young Priests Society
- Emily Taaffe (born 1984), Irish actress
- Michael Taaffe (born 2003), American football player
