= Ballymote Castle =

Medieval castle in Sligo, Ireland

Ballymote Castle
- Irish: Caisleán Bhaile an Mhóta
- County Sligo, Connacht; Near Ballymote in Ireland
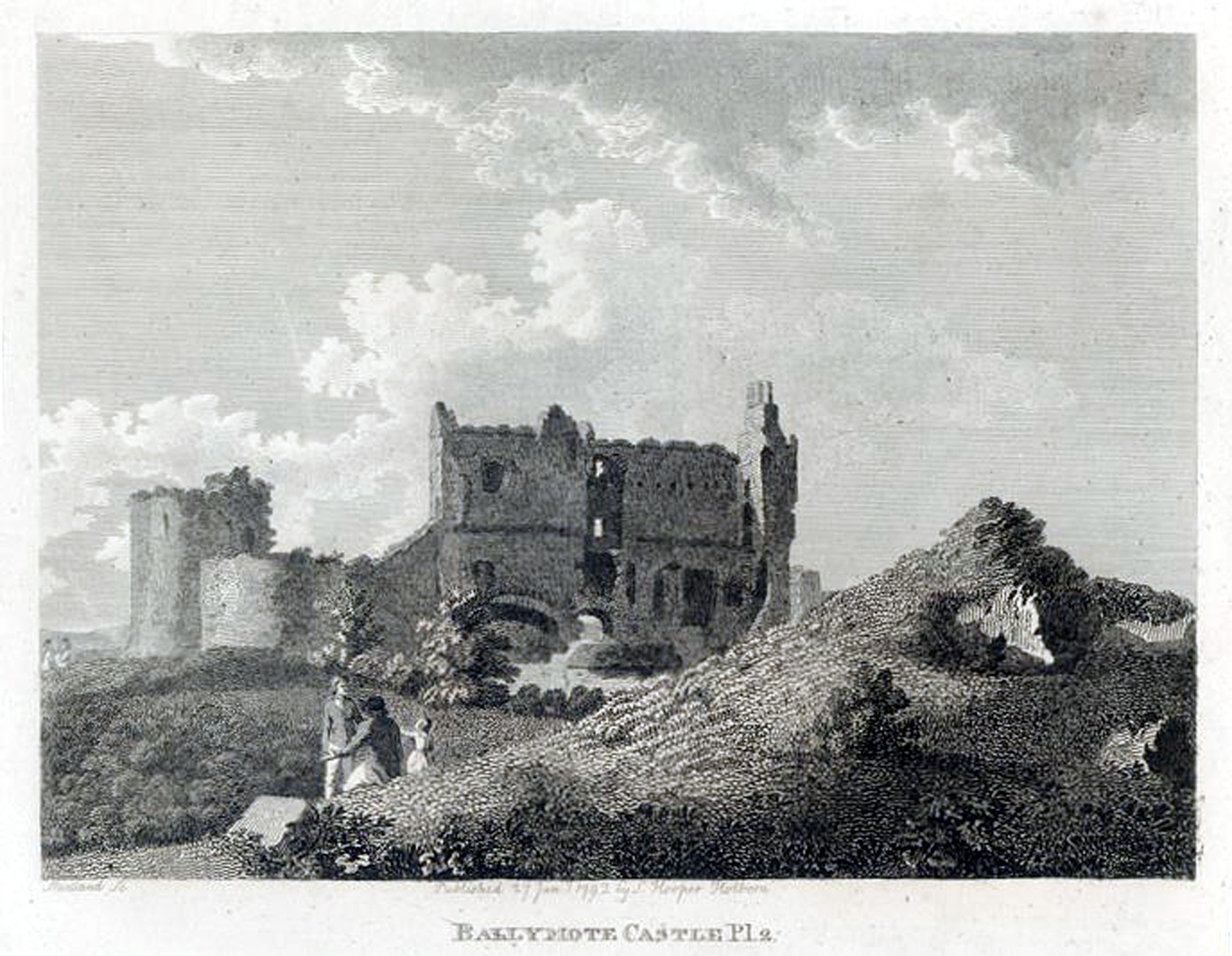
- The castle in the 1790s

Site information
- Type: Norman castle
- Owner: Office of Public Works
- Open to the public: No
- Condition: Ruined

Location
- Location in Ireland
- Coordinates: 54°5′14.28″N 8°31′14.52″W

Site history
- Built: 1300ish
- Built by: Richard de Burgh
- In use: 1300-Late 17th Century
- Fate: Fell into Ruin
- Battles/wars: Irish Nine Year's War

National monument of Ireland
- Official name: Ballymote Castle
- Reference no.: 638

Ballymote Castle (Irish: Caisleán Bhaile an Mhóta) is a large rectangular keepless castle, built around 1300. It is located in the townland of Carrownanty on the outskirts of Ballymote in southern County Sligo, Ireland. This area was known historically as Átha Cliath an Chorainn, which roughly translates as The Ford of the Hurdles of Corann. It is the last of the Norman castles in Connacht. It was probably built in order to protect the newly won possessions of Richard Óg de Burgh, 2nd Earl of Ulster (also known as the Red Earl), in County Sligo, some distance from an earlier motte.

== Construction and design ==
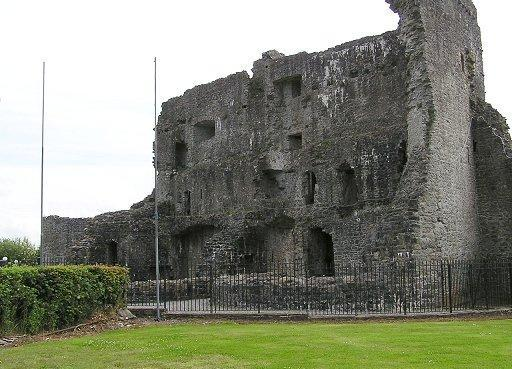
Ballymote Castle showing gatehouse

Ballymote castle is a large enclosure castle, the most symmetrical of all the Irish "keepless" castles. It has many similarities with Beaumaris Castle, in Anglesey, Wales, built by King Edward I of England. The entrance, with a double towered gate, is in the north wall and had twin D-shaped towers. It has a gatehouse typical of the period, the outer portions of which have almost completely disappeared. The castle, however, remains an impressive structure. The interior measures about 300 square metres (3,200 ft^{2}). There are three-quarter round towers at all four corners and also in the middle of the east and west walls. A postern gate, which was planned for the centre of the south wall, was never completed, probably because of the events of 1317, when the castle was lost to the O'Connors. A small square tower had protected this gate.

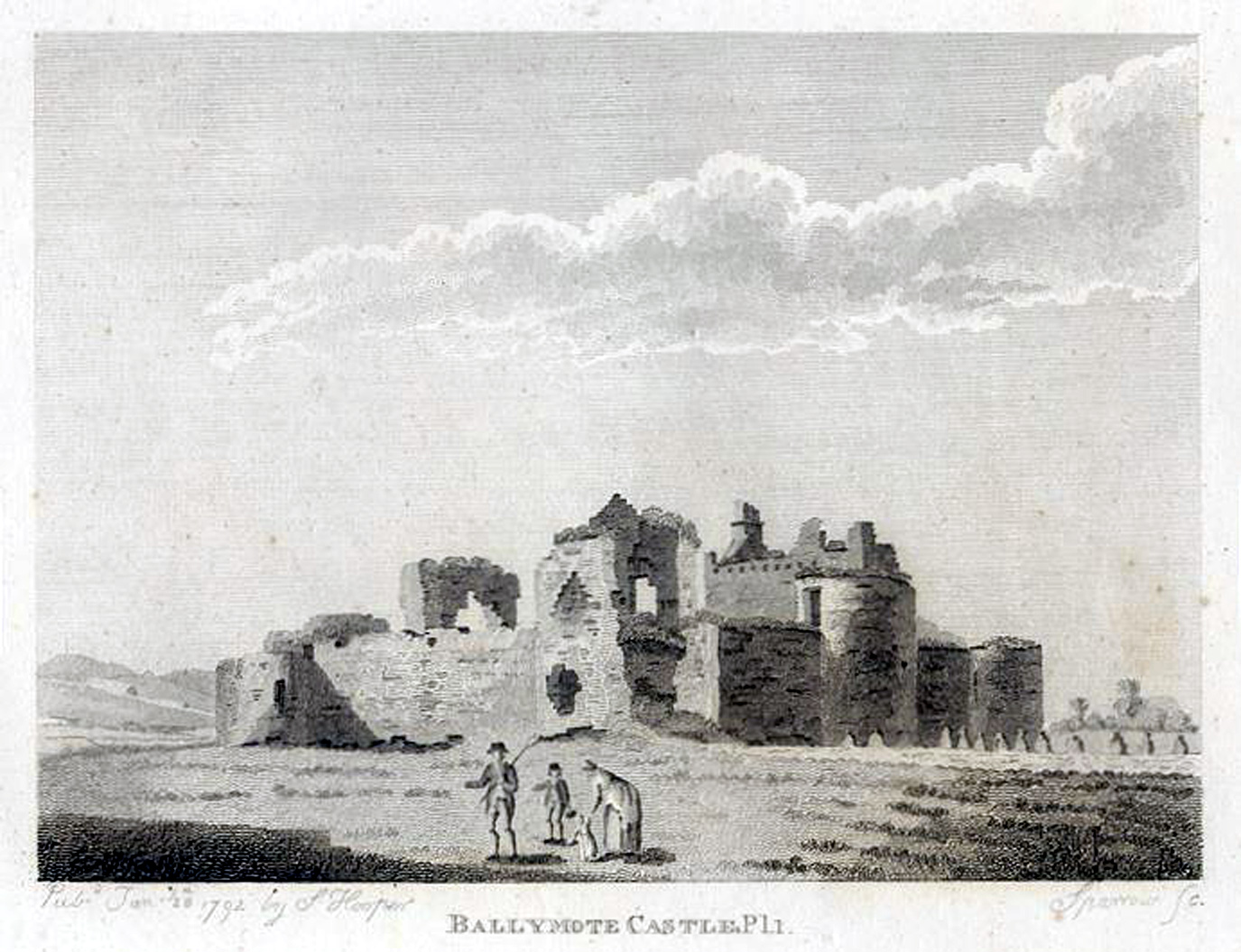
A view from the 1790s

The walls are about 3.0 metres (10 ft) thick and flanked with six noble towers. Passages of about 0.91 metres (3 ft) wide ran through the centre of the walls all around and the passages were built in such a way that they gave access to the towers, and to the intervening curtain walls at different heights, thereby meeting the needs of attack or defence.

No traces of the interior domestic buildings survive.

Local folklore suggests that underground passages connected Emlaghfad church with the castle and with the nearby Franciscan Abbey, though such stories are common throughout Ireland and are unlikely to be based on fact.

The Red Earl is also credited with building the ancient road from Boyle, County Roscommon to Collooney, known as Bóthar an Corann and as the Red Earls Road.

== History of occupation ==
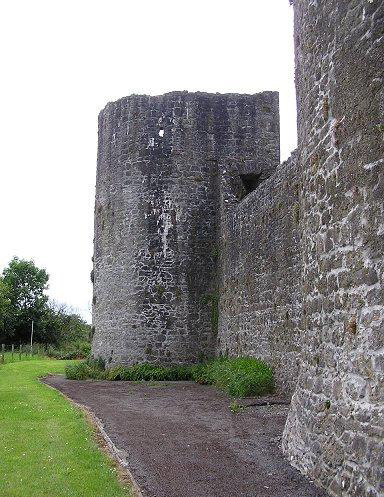
Curtain wall and towers of Ballymote Castle

The castle changed hands many times since construction. It was captured by the O'Connors of Sligo in 1317, but was taken by the Mac Diarmada, during the course of local struggles, in 1347. By 1381 it had passed to the McDonaghs.

Although owned by Tadhg MacDermot, one of the last of the Kings of Moylurg in 1561, it appears to have passed to the O'Connor Sligo by 1571, at which time he surrendered the castle and had it regranted to him by James I of England. In 1577, the castle fell into English hands for a short period and then more permanently in 1584, when it was taken by the Governor of Connacht Richard Bingham. A lack of occupation levels implies that the building was virtually abandoned during the above period (from 1317 to 1584).

The O'Connors, O'Hartes and O'Dowds sacked the castle in 1588. The English surrendered it in 1598 to the MacDonaghs who sold it shortly afterwards to Red Hugh O'Donnell (one source says he bought it for £400 and 300 cows). It was from here that Red Hugh O'Donnell marched to the disastrous Battle of Kinsale in 1601. When the O' Donnells surrendered it to the English in 1602, it was already in a bad state of repair. In 1633, the Taaffes owned it for a short time, but had to surrender it again to the English Parliamentary forces in 1652. In the Williamite wars the castle was held by Captain Terence MacDonagh for King James II, but he had to surrender it to Lord Granard in the face of an artillery attack in 1690. Soon afterwards the fortifications were made harmless, the moat was filled up and the castle fell into ruins.

In more recent years the Office of Public Works have carried out preservation work on the castle.

== Access ==
The castle is on the R296, Ballymote to Tubbercurry road, opposite the Ballymote railway station, and just past the Catholic church. Access is through the grounds of the Ballymote Community nursing unit. Open from 9 am – 5 pm Monday to Sunday.

== See also ==
- List of castles in Ireland
