= R293 road (Ireland) =

Road in Ireland

R293 road
- Bóthar R293
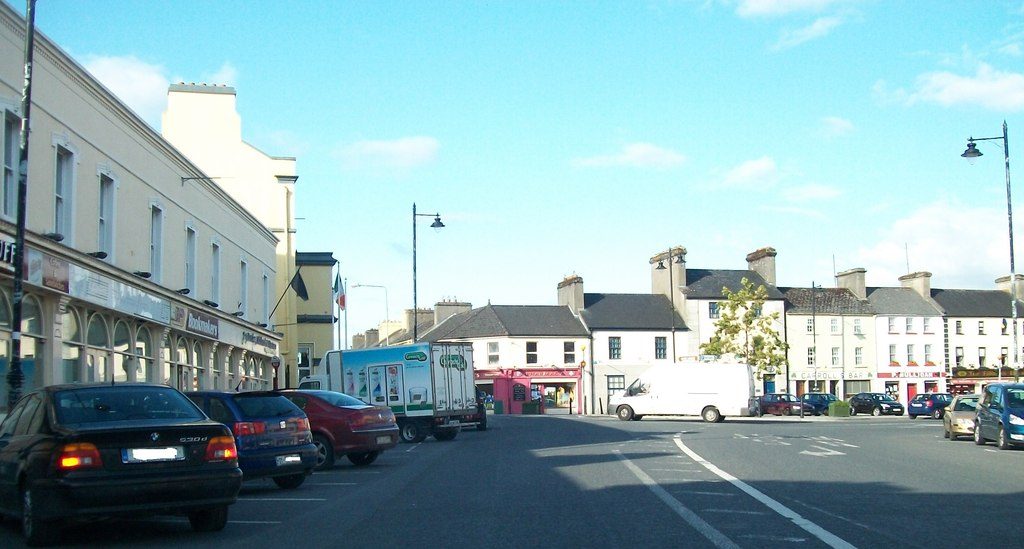
- Main Street, Ballaghaderreen, on the R293

Route information
- Length: 55 km (34 mi)

Location
- Country: Ireland
- Primary destinations: County Sligo; Leaves the N17 at Ballinabole, near Collooney; Ballymote – (R295)/(R296); Gorteen – (R294); County Roscommon; Ballaghaderreen – (N5); Lisacul – (R325); Gortaganny; County Mayo; Terminates at the N83 1 km (0.62 mi) north of Ballyhaunis

Highway system
- Roads in Ireland; Motorways; Primary; Secondary; Regional

The R293 road is a regional road in Ireland linking the N17, via a junction in the townland of Ballinabole near Collooney in County Sligo, to the outskirts of Ballyhaunis in County Mayo. En route it passes through three towns, Ballymote and Gorteen in County Sligo and Ballaghaderreen in County Roscommon. The road is 55 km (34 mi) long (map).

The government legislation that defines the R293, the Roads Act 1993 (Classification of Regional Roads) Order 2012 (Statutory Instrument 54 of 2012), provides the following official description:

Ballynaboll, County Sligo — Ballaghaderreen, County Roscommon — Ballyhaunis, County Mayo

Between its junction with N17 at Ballynaboll in the county of Sligo and its junction with N5 at Market Square Ballaghaderreen in the county of Roscommon via Carrowcushcly; Teeling Street, Lord Edward Street and OConnell Street at Ballymote; Coagh, Gorteen and Doon in the county of Sligo: Drumacoo; and Pound Street at Ballaghaderreen in the county of Roscommon

and

between its junction with N5 at Market Street Ballaghaderreen and its junction with R325 at Crunaun via Main Street at Ballaghaderreen all in the county of Roscommon

and

between its junction with R325 at Kiltybranks in the county of Roscommon and its junction with N83 at Kilmannin in the county of Mayo via Lisacul, Meelick and Tully in the county of Roscommon: and Gorteen in the county of Mayo.

== See also ==
- List of roads of County Mayo
- National primary road
- National secondary road
- Roads in Ireland
