= Earlsfield (disambiguation) =

Earlsfield is an area of the London Borough of Wandsworth.

Earlsfield or Earlesfield may also refer to:

- Earlsfield, Queensland, a parish now in Jambin, Australia
- Earlesfield, an area of Grantham, Lincolnshire, England
- Carrowcauly, also known as Earlsfield, a townland in Corran, Sligo, Ireland
- Earlsfield Estate, near Manorhamilton, Sligo, Ireland
- Earlsfield railway station, London
