= Sheffield Grace =

Irish historiographer and genealogist

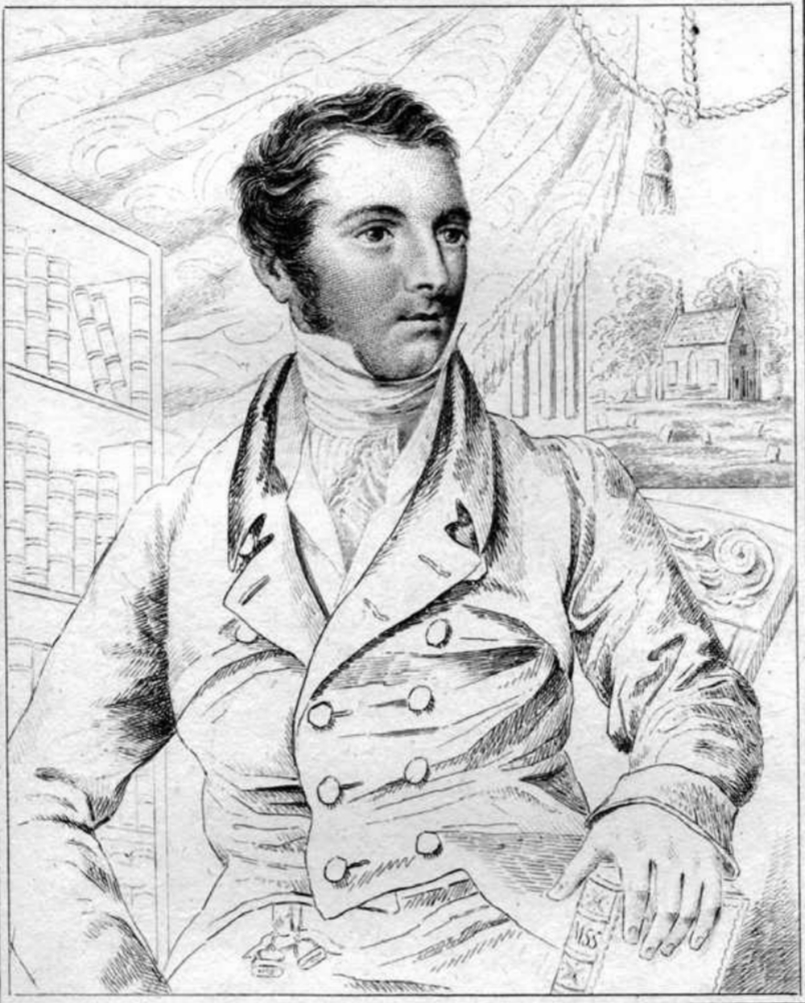
- Born: 1788
- Died: 5 July 1850 (aged 61–62); Knole House, Tunbridge Wells
- Occupations: Historiographer and genealogist

Richard Sheffield Grace (1788 – 5 July 1850) was an Irish historiographer and genealogist.

== Biography ==
Grace was the second son of Richard Grace (died 1801) of Boley, Queen's County, Ireland, M.P. for Baltimore, by Jane, daughter of John Evans, son of George, first lord Carbery. He studied at Winchester College, became a member of Lincoln's Inn, 1806, matriculated at St. Mary Hall, Oxford, 2 July 1813, aged 25, and was elected a fellow of the Royal Society and of the Society of Antiquaries, London (Foster, Alumni Oxon. ii. 547). He was created D.C.L. at Oxford, 27 June 1827. He died at Knole House, Tunbridge Wells, on 5 July 1850. He married Harriet Georgiana, daughter of Lieutenant-general Sir John Hamilton, by whom he left a son and two daughters. Grace befriended the novelist John Banim, and was panegyrised by Samuel Carter Hall.

Grace published for private circulation:

- "A Descriptive and Architectural Sketch" of the Grace mausoleum in Queen's County, originally contributed to William Shaw Mason's "Statistical Account or Parochial Survey of Ireland," vol. iii., Dublin, 1819, and reprinted (Dublin, 1819), with additional matter and illustrations, including a portrait of the author.
- "Memoirs of the Family of Grace," a semi-romantic and panegyrical work (1823), with a dedication to the Duchess of Buckingham and Chandos, and including many portraits and sketches, mainly from plates which had been used for other books. Severe strictures were made on these memoirs by William Beckford of Fonthill.
- "Re-impressions from Thomas Worlidge's Etchings of Antique Gems," 1823, 4to, originally published in 1768.
- "A Letter from Winifrid Herbert, Countess of Nithsdale, to her sister, Lady Lucy Herbert, Abbess of English Augustine nuns at Bruges, containing a circumstantial account of the Escape of her Husband, William Maxwell, fifth Earl of Nithsdale, from the Tower of London on the 12th of February, 1716–17," London, 1827, dedicated to Mary, marchioness of Chandos.
- "An Ancient Feudal War-song … the Slogan or War-cry of the Retainers and Clansmen of the Family of Grace, Barons of Courtown and Lords of the Cantred of Grace's Country, with Translations from the original Gaelic or Iberno-Celtic Language into Metrical Versions of the English, French, Italian, German, Spanish, Greek, and Latin languages, Selected and Composed by Sheffield Grace," London, 1839. In this were included many engravings and pedigrees which had appeared in the Grace memoirs.

After his death, Grace was accused of having embellished his family's history.
