= 1988 Sligo Senior Football Championship =

Gaelic football competition

Tournament details
- County: Sligo
- Year: 1988

Winners
- Champions: St. Patrick's, Dromard (6th win)
- Manager: James Kearins
- Captain: Seamus Reilly

Promotion/Relegation
- Promoted team(s): Tourlestrane
- Relegated team(s): Easkey

This is a round-up of the 1988 Sligo Senior Football Championship. St. Patrick's, Dromard regained the Owen B. Hunt Cup after a fourteen-year wait, and it was a hard-earned title, having defeated the two leading lights of the 1980s - holders St. Mary's and Tubbercurry. St. Mary's were seen off emphatically after a quarter-final replay, bringing the curtain down on a remarkable era for the Sligo town club, and the Dromard side defeated Tubbercurry by a single point in the final.

== First round ==
Game	Date	Venue	Team A	Score	Team B	Score
Sligo SFC; First Round	10 July	Ballymote	Tubbercurry	2-8	Curry	1-7
Sligo SFC; First Round	10 July	Ballymote	St. Nathy's	1-9	Geevagh	0-7
Sligo SFC; First Round	10 July	Markievicz Park	Innisfree Gaels	0-5	Owenmore Gaels/Coolera	0-5
Sligo SFC; First Round	10 July	Markievicz Park	St. Pat's	2-14	Grange/Cliffoney/Maugherow	1-5
Sligo SFC; First Round	10 July	Tubbercurry	Enniscrone/Castleconnor	0-11	Tourlestrane/Cloonacool	1-6
Sligo SFC; First Round	10 July	Tubbercurry	Eastern Harps	2-12	Easkey	2-2
Sligo SFC; First Round Replay	17 July	Markievicz Park	Innisfree Gaels	0-9	Owenmore Gaels/Coolera	0-5

== Quarter finals ==
Game	Date	Venue	Team A	Score	Team B	Score
Sligo SFC; Quarter Final	31 July	Markievicz Park	Tubbercurry	2-10	Enniscrone/Castleconnor	1-5
Sligo SFC; Quarter Final	31 July	Tubbercurry	St. Nathy's	0-11	Innisfree Gaels	0-7
Sligo SFC; Quarter Final	31 July	Ballymote	Eastern Harps	3-6	Shamrock Gaels	2-6
Sligo SFC; Quarter Final	31 July	Ballymote	St. Patrick's	0-9	St. Mary's	2-3
Sligo SFC; Quarter Final Replay	7 August	Ballymote	St. Patrick's	1-14	St. Mary's	0-6

== Semi-finals ==
Game	Date	Venue	Team A	Score	Team B	Score
Sligo SFC; Semi-Final	28 August	Ballymote	Tubbercurry	0-9	St. Nathy's	0-7
Sligo SFC; Semi-Final	28 August	Ballymote	St. Patrick's	0-8	Eastern Harps	0-6

== Sligo Senior Football Championship Final ==
St. Patrick's	2-6 - 0-11 (final score after 60 minutes)	Tubbercurry
Team: S. Clarke; J. Kilcullen; D. Foley; J. Kiely; T. Kilgallon; P. Kilgallon; J. Dorran; G. Boland (1-0); T. Mahon (0-2); T. Clarke (0-1); S. Reilly (Capt); O. Cavanagh; J. Clarke; J. Kearins (1-2); N. Kearins (0-1) Substitutes: B. Flynn; L. Boland	Half-time: 1-3 - 0-5 Competition: Sligo Senior Football Championship (Final) Date: 11 September 1988 Venue: Corran Park, Ballymote Referee: Francis Finan (Coolera/Strandhill)	Team: P. Kilcoyne; J. Stenson; G. Gilmartin; T. Killoran; L. Gilmartin; O. Wynne; P. Gilmartin; E. Gilmartin; J. Murphy; P. Regan; B. Kilcoyne (0-3); P. Seevers (0-7); R. McCarrick; D. Leen; M. Curran Substitutes: S. Gallagher; N. Killoran (0-1)
