= Earl of Carlingford =

Extinct title in the Peerage of Ireland

The title of Earl of Carlingford was created in the Peerage of Ireland for Theobald Taaffe. The Earl bore the subsidiary titles Viscount Taaffe and Baron of Ballymote (1628).

== Taaffe family history ==
1st Viscount Taaffe of Corren left fifteen children, of whom the eldest, Theobald, was created Earl of Carlingford.

Theobald's eldest son was killed in the Turkish wars. He was succeeded in the title by his second son Nicholas, who had served in the Spanish wars and was killed at the Boyne.

The next brother, Francis, the third Earl, was one of the most celebrated men of his time: he was brought up at Olomouc, at the imperial court, and in the service of Duke Charles of Lorraine, whose most intimate friend he became. He rose to the highest rank in the Austrian army, having greatly distinguished himself at the Battle of Vienna and in the other Turkish campaigns, and was a member of the Order of the Golden Fleece. He was sent on many important diplomatic missions, and at the end of his life was chancellor and chief minister to the Duke of Lorraine.

Notwithstanding the Jacobite connections of his family, Francis' title to the Earldom of Carlingford was confirmed by William III, and the attainder and forfeiture of the estates incurred by his brother was repealed. This favour he owed to his position at the court of the Emperor, William's most important ally. On his death the title and estates went to his nephew Theobald, whose father had fallen during the Siege of Derry, and who himself had served with distinction in the Austrian army.

On his death, the title of Earl of Carlingford became extinct; both the Austrian and Irish estates as well as the Irish viscountcy went to a cousin, Nicholas, 6th Viscount Taaffe. An unrelated Carlingford barony was created for Chichester Parkinson-Fortescue in 1874.

== Viscounts Taaffe (1628) ==
- Sir John Taaffe, 1st Viscount Taaffe (died before 1641/2)
- Theobald Taaffe, 2nd Viscount Taaffe, 1st Earl of Carlingford (died 1677)

== Earls of Carlingford ==
- Theobald Taaffe 1st Earl of Carlingford (died 1677)
- Nicholas Taaffe, 2nd Earl of Carlingford (died 2 July 1690, at the Battle of the Boyne)
- Francis Taaffe 3rd Earl of Carlingford (1639–1704), an Austrian field marshal and Knight of the Golden Fleece
- Theobald Taaffe 4th Earl of Carlingford (died 24 November 1738); fought against the Turks. With his death the earldom became extinct, but the subsidiary title Viscount Taaffe went to a cousin Nicholas Taaffe.
