= Bunnanadden =

Bunnanaddan Bun an Fheadáin
- Village
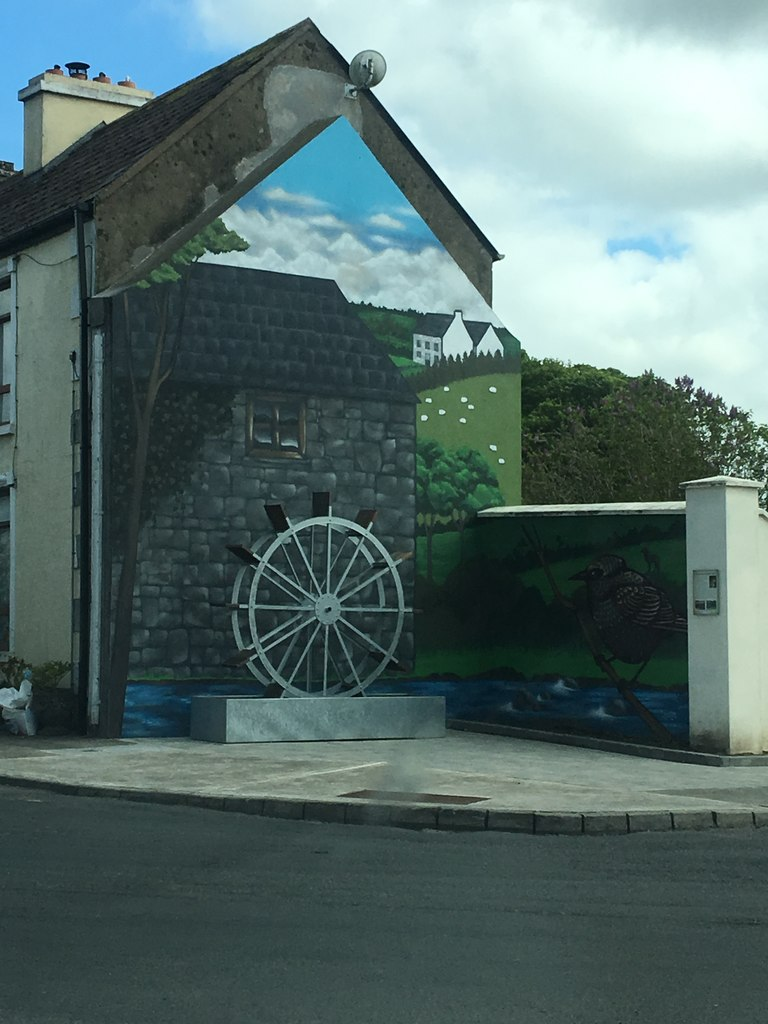
- Mural in Bunnanaddan

- Location in Ireland
- Coordinates: 54°03′08″N 8°36′18″W
- Country: Ireland
- Province: Connacht
- County: County Sligo
- Elevation: 70 m (230 ft)
- Irish Grid Reference: G602125

Bunnanadden, Bunnanaddan or Bunninadden (Irish: Bun an Fheadáin) is a small village in south County Sligo, Ireland. It is on the R296 road, 9 km from Tubbercurry and 8 km from Ballymote.

The village contains the parish church (The Sacred Heart of Mary), two pubs, a national school and sports hall. It formerly had two shops and a post office, the last of which closed in early 2011.

The village is in the parish of Bunnanadden with a second church in Killavil.

The local gaelic football club is Bunninadden GAA, founded in 1886, which also includes the parishes of Doocastle and Killavil.

== Landmarks ==
- Sonny McDonagh Memorial, an Irish Flute player in the South Sligo style, 1926–1991.
- Church of the Sacred Heart, Bunninadden

== Notable people ==
- Michael Coleman, Irish folk musician
- John O'Dowd (1856–1937), Irish Parliamentary Party MP 1900–1918
- John Scanlon, Wisconsin farmer/legislator
