= R294 road (Ireland) =

Regional road in Ireland

R294 road
- Bóthar R294
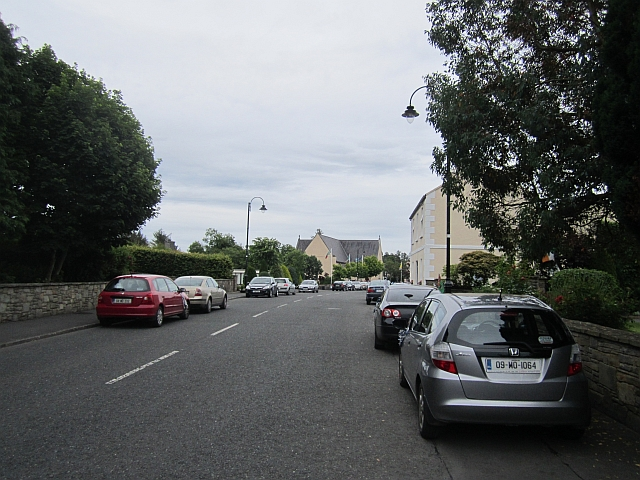
- Bonniconlon, County Mayo, on the R294

Route information
- Length: 66 km (41 mi)

Location
- Country: Ireland
- Primary destinations: County Roscommon; N4 road; Boyle (N61); Crosses the Boyle River; R295; County Sligo; Gorteen (R293); R296; L4505 and L4403 local roads; Tobercurry (N17); L4503 local road; Crosses the Owenaher River; County Mayo; Crosses the Fiddaun River; Crosses the Black River; Bonniconlon; Crosses the River Moy; Ballina (N26, N59)

Highway system
- Roads in Ireland; Motorways; Primary; Secondary; Regional

The R294 road is a regional road in counties Roscommon, Mayo, and Sligo in Ireland. It connects the N4 road near Boyle to the N26 and N59 roads in Ballina, 66 kilometres (41 mi) away (map).

The government legislation that defines the R294, the Roads Act 1993 (Classification of Regional Roads) Order 2012 (Statutory Instrument 54 of 2012), provides the following official description:

Boyle, County Roscommon — Tobercurry, County Sligo — Ballina, County Mayo

Between its junction with N4 at Kilbryan and its junction with N61 at Carrick Road in the town of Boyle via Warren all in the county of Roscommon

and

between its junction with N61 at Bridge Street in the town of Boyle in the county of Roscommon and its junction with N17 at Station Road Tobercurry in the county of Sligo via Patrick Street in the town of Boyle; and Mocmoyne in the county of Roscommon: Mullaghroe, Gorteen, Rathmadder, Knocknaskeagh, Quarryfield; Emmett Street, Wolfe Tone Square and Teeling Street at Tobercurry in the county of Sligo

and

between its junction with N17 at Circular Road Tobercurry in the county of Sligo and its junction with N59 at Cathedral Road in the town of Ballina via Station Road at Tobercurry; Drummartin and Largan in the county of Sligo: Bunnyconnellan, Behy and Ardnaree in the county of Mayo: and Abbey Street in the town of Ballina.

and

between its junction with N59 at Emmet Street and N59 at Teeling Street in the town of Ballina via Bridge Street O’Rahilly Street and Bury Street (and via Garden Street and Tone Street) in the town of Ballina.

== See also ==
- List of roads of County Mayo
- National primary road
- National secondary road
- Regional road
- Roads in Ireland
