= Lisacul =

Village in County Roscommon, Ireland

Lisacul Lios an Choill
- Village
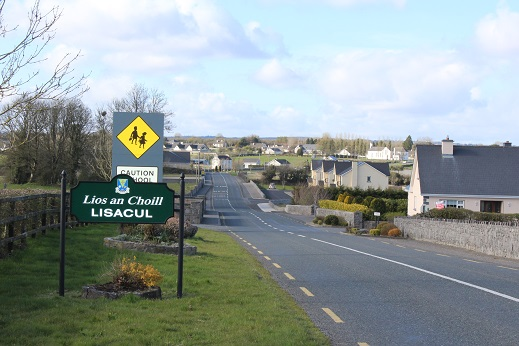
- Entering Lisacul at Cloontowart

- Location in Ireland
- Coordinates: 53.858421°N 8.630480°W
- Country: Ireland
- Province: Connacht
- County: County Roscommon
- Elevation: 80 m (260 ft)
- Time zone: UTC+0 (WET)
  - Summer (DST): UTC-1 (IST (WEST))
- Irish Grid Reference: M911163
- Website: lisaculinfo.ie

Lisacul (Irish: Lios an Choill, meaning 'fort of the hazel tree') is a village in County Roscommon, Ireland.

The village is in the north-west of the county, midway between Ballyhaunis and Ballaghaderreen, on the R293 road. It is part of the Barony of Frenchpark (the de Freyne family). Lisacul lies on the Lung River which is popular with anglers. There are several ancient ring forts in the area.

== Education ==
There are two schools in Lisacul. Brightsparks Pre-School and Lisacul National School. Brightsparks has a roll of 28 pupils and five staff, while the national school (as of 2016) had over 70 pupils and five active teaching staff.

== Geography ==
The principal river in Lisacul, the River Lung, is well stocked with fish, chiefly bream, perch, pike, roach and rudd and attracts anglers during the fishing season. The Loughglynn and District Angling Association holds open competitions throughout the year in the lakes around Loughglynn and Lisacul. The Lung takes its name from the Luighne people, who claimed ancestry from Lugh, the Celtic war deity.

Lisacul has at least seven ring forts and, according to tradition, there is a treasure buried in one of these. The main fort was situated in Whitestown, and all the other forts were said to be visible from this. One of the forts is now part of the grounds of Lisacul's national school. Another, in Kiltybranks, has a cave: during the rural electrification scheme in the late 1950s human remains were found there.

Pollawaddy cave is located approximately 1.5 km southwest of Lisacul village in Carrownaknockaun townland. The cave has a surveyed length of 45.5m and was explored and surveyed in September 2000 by David Drew and Caoimhe Hickey.

== Community centre (Memorial Hall) ==
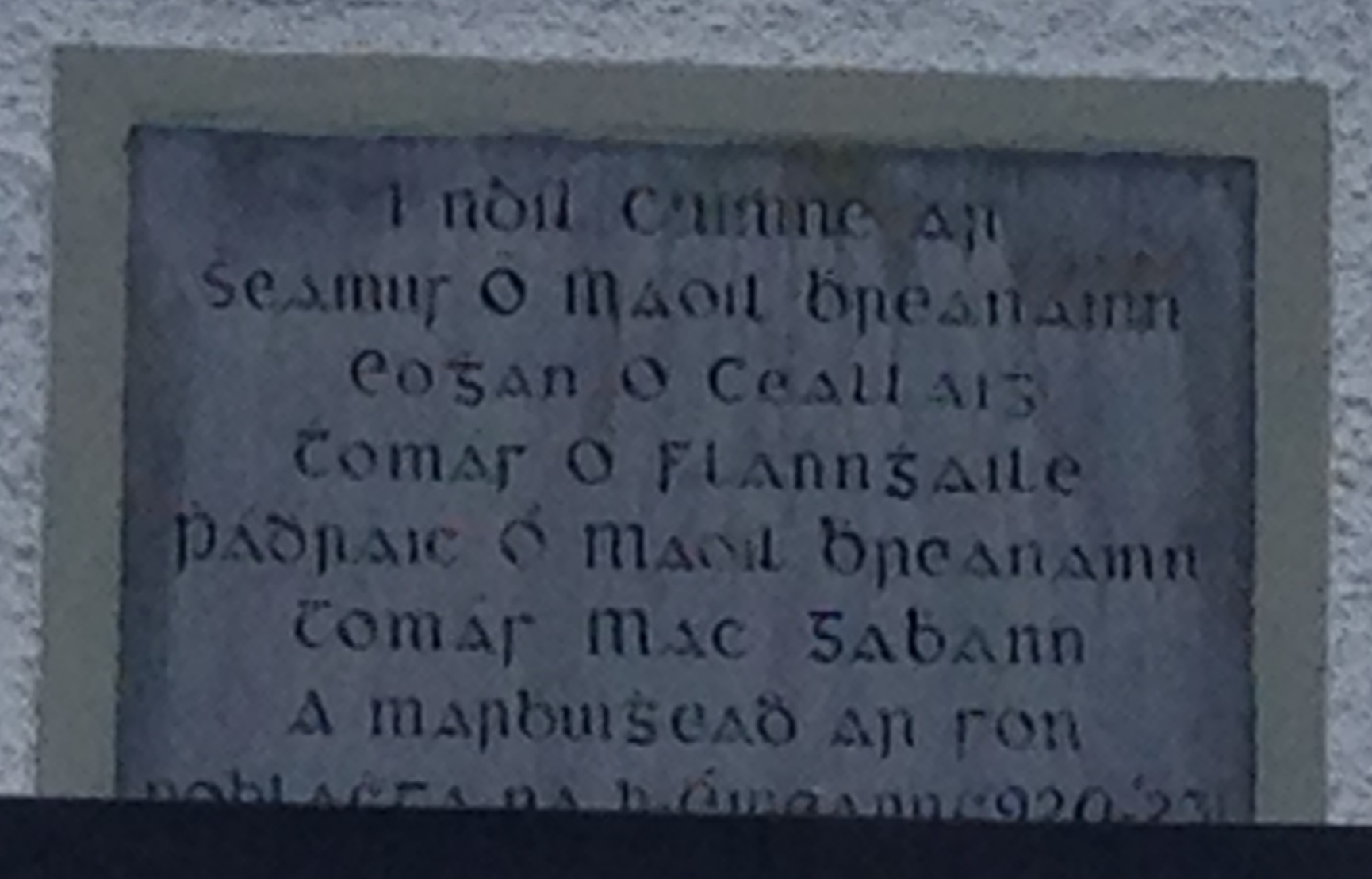
Dedication plaque on Lisacul Memorial Hall

The community centre in Lisacul was originally built in the 1930s, with a new extension completed in 2013. The original building was raised as a memorial to locals who died between 1920 and 1923 in the War of Independence and the Civil War. The dedication plaque reads:

I ndil cuimhne ar
Sheamus O’Maoil Bhreanainn
Eoghan O’Ceallaigh
Thomas O’ Flannghaile
Phadhraic O’ Maoil Bhreanainn
Tomas Mac Gabhann
A marbhuigheadh ar son poblacta na h-Eireann (1920-23)

(In memory of James Mulrennan, Eugene Kelly, Thomas Flannery, Patrick Mulrennan [and] Thomas McGowan who died for the republic of Ireland (1920-1923))

== Handball alley ==
The original handball alley was built in 1916, using donated materials and voluntary labour. It was opened by the principal of the local school, Bill Ford. It was demolished and rebuilt in the 1970s. Refurbishments since have included adding tiered seating and wheelchair access.

== Community ==
In 2016, members of the Lisacul community undertook a project, the "365 Project" to assemble an archive of photographs (one for each day of the year) capturing the people, places and things in the Lisacul area.
