= Frenchpark (barony) =

Barony (land unit) in County Roscommon, Ireland

Frenchpark Dún Gar (Irish)
- Barony
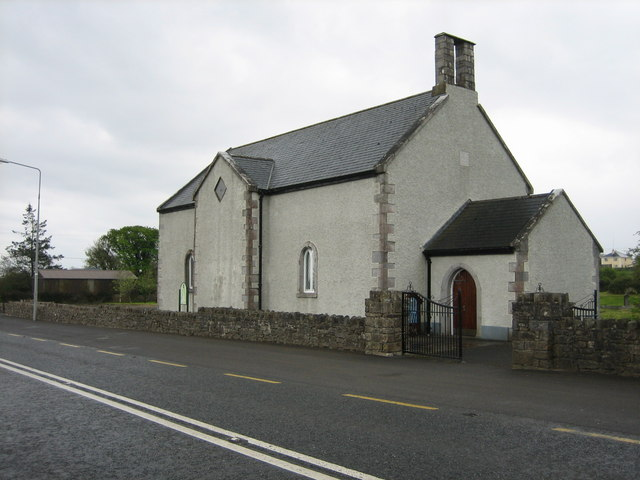
- Douglas Hyde Centre, near Frenchpark

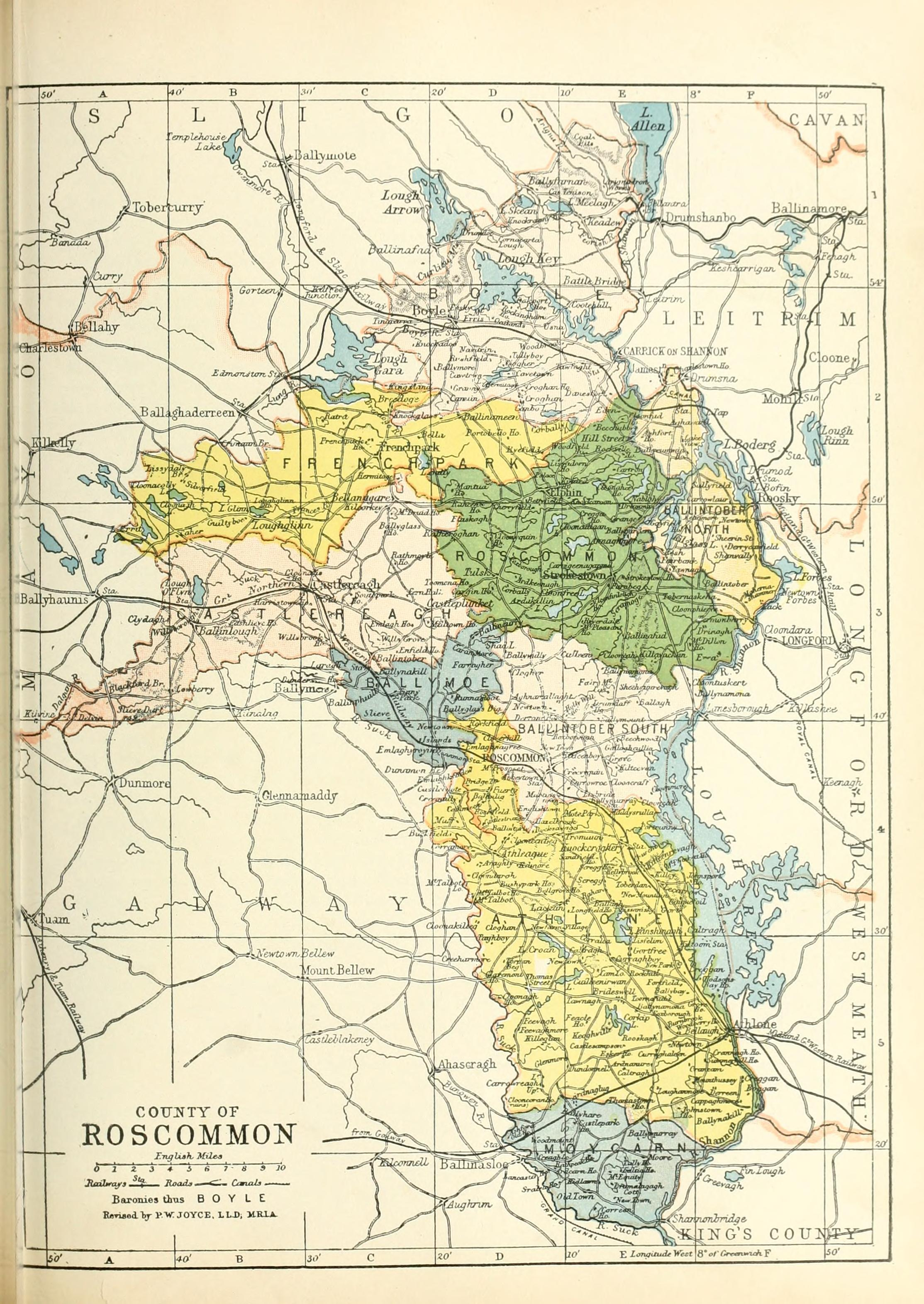
- Barony map of County Roscommon, 1900; Frenchpark is coloured yellow, in the northwest.
- Sovereign state: Ireland
- Province: Connacht
- County: Roscommon

Area
  - Total: 288.15 km^{2} (111.26 sq mi)

Frenchpark (Irish: Dún Gar) is a barony in County Roscommon, Ireland.

== Etymology ==
Frenchpark barony is named after Frenchpark town, which takes its name from the French (ffrench) family, powerful in the area from the 17th century onward, after Dominick French was granted 5,000 acres (20 km^{2}) in the area in 1666. The town was previously called Dún Gar, "hillfort of favour."

The Holder of the Barony of Frenchpark is today Michel Pilette Vlug of Kinnear, Baron of Kinnear

== Geography ==
Frenchpark barony is located in the northwest of County Roscommon, south of Lough Gara.

== History ==
This region was originally disputed between Magh Luirg and Airtech. A sept of the Cíarraige were early lords of Airteach, which was later taken by the McDonaghs. The O'Flanagans here were hereditary stewards to the Kings of Connacht.

Frenchpark barony was originally part of the Boyle barony; it was divided off, then lost two townlands to Roscommon barony and gained six from County Mayo in the Boundary Survey (Ireland) Act 1859. The Frenches later became Barons de Freyne.

== List of settlements ==
Below is a list of settlements in Frenchpark barony:

- Frenchpark
- Lisacul
- Loughglinn
