= Taaffeite =

Rare gemstone

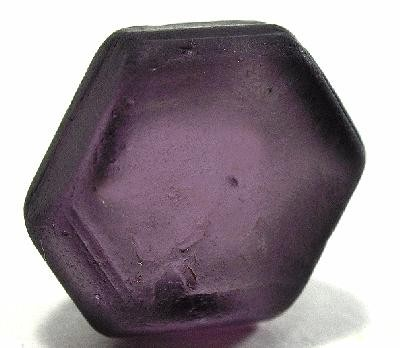
- Magnesiotaaffeite-2N’2S (Mg_{3}Al_{8}BeO_{16})

General
- Category: Oxide minerals
- Formula: BeMgAl_{4}O_{8}
- IMA symbol: Tf
- Strunz classification: 4.FC.25
- Crystal system: Hexagonal
- Crystal class: Dihexagonal pyramidal (6mm); Trigonal dipyramidal (3̅m) (magnesiotaaffeite-6N'3S and ferrotaaffeite-6N'3S)

Identification
- Color: Colorless, greyish violet, violet red, red, greenish, light green, pink violet, mauve
- Crystal habit: Prismatic, alluvial grains
- Twinning: By reflection on (0001)?
- Cleavage: Imperfect/fair/absent
- Fracture: Conchoidal
- Mohs scale hardness: 8–8.5
- Luster: Vitreous
- Streak: White
- Diaphaneity: Transparent to translucent
- Specific gravity: 3.60–3.61
- Optical properties: Uniaxial
- Refractive index: n_{ω} = 1.722, n_{ε} = 1.777
- Birefringence: δ = 0.055
- Pleochroism: Weak

Taaffeite (/ˈtɑːfaɪt/; BeMgAl_{4}O_{8}) is a mineral, named after its discoverer Richard Taaffe (1898–1967) who found the first sample, a cut and polished gem, in October 1945 in a jeweler's shop in Dublin, Ireland. As such, it is the only gemstone to have been initially identified from a faceted stone. Taaffeite is a million times rarer than diamonds, and it comes in shades of purple, pink, red. Most pieces of the gem, prior to Taaffe, had been misidentified as spinel. For many years afterwards, it was known only in a few samples, and it is still one of the rarest gemstone minerals in the world.

Since 2002, the International Mineralogical Association-approved name for taaffeite as a mineral is magnesiotaaffeite-2N'2S.

== Discovery ==
Taaffe bought a number of precious stones from a jeweller in October 1945. Upon noticing inconsistencies between the taaffeite and spinels, Taaffe sent some examples to B. W. Anderson of the Laboratory of the London Chamber of Commerce for identification on 1 November 1945. When Anderson replied on 5 November 1945, he told Taaffe that they were unsure of whether it was a spinel or something new; he also offered to write it up in Gemologist.

== Properties ==
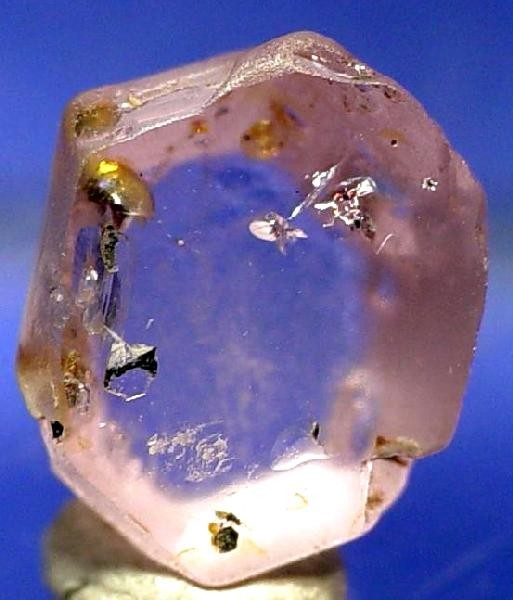
Specimen from Ratnapura, Sri Lanka

In 1951, chemical and X-ray analysis confirmed the principal constituents of taaffeite as beryllium, magnesium, and aluminium, making taaffeite the first mineral to contain both beryllium and magnesium as essential components.

The confusion between spinel and taaffeite is understandable as certain structural features are identical in both. Anderson et al., classified taaffeite as an intermediate mineral between spinel and chrysoberyl. Unlike spinel, taaffeite displays the property of double refraction that allows distinction between these two minerals.

== Usage ==
Because of its rarity, taaffeite is used only as a gemstone. For more rare cases, it is rarely faceted because of the lack of starting material.

== Formation and occurrence ==
Taaffeite occurs in carbonate rocks alongside fluorite, mica, spinel, and tourmaline. This extremely rare mineral is increasingly found in alluvial deposits in Sri Lanka and southern Tanzania, as well as lower grade taaffeite in limestone sediments in China.

== See also ==
- List of minerals
- Musgravite
