= Musgravite =

Rare oxide mineral and gemstone

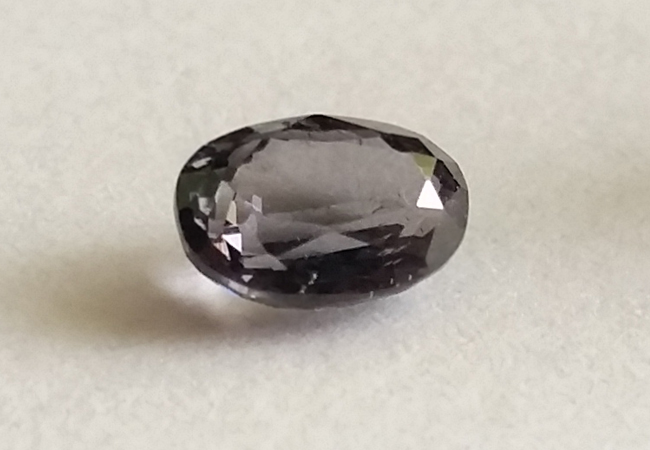
- Musgravite from Sri Lanka

General
- Category: Oxide minerals
- Formula: (Mg,Fe,Zn)_{2}BeAl_{6}O_{12}
- Strunz classification: 04.FC.25
- Crystal system: Trigonal

Identification
- Color: Grey green to green
- Fracture: Conchoidal
- Mohs scale hardness: 8–8.5
- Luster: Vitreous
- Diaphaneity: Transparent
- Specific gravity: 3.62–3.68
- Optical properties: Uniaxial
- Refractive index: n_{ω} = 1.739, n_{ε} = 1.735
- Birefringence: δ = 0.014 to 0.016

Musgravite or magnesiotaaffeite-6N’3S is a rare oxide mineral used as a gemstone. Its type locality is the Ernabella Mission, Musgrave Ranges, South Australia, for which it was named following its discovery in 1967. It is a member of the taaffeite family of minerals, and its chemical formula is Be(Mg, Fe, Zn)_{2}Al_{6}O_{12}. Its hardness is 8 to 8.5 on the Mohs scale. Due to its rarity, the mineral can sell for roughly USD35,000 per carat.

== See also ==
- List of minerals
