= Bonniconlon, County Mayo =

Coordinates: 54°06′N 9°01′W

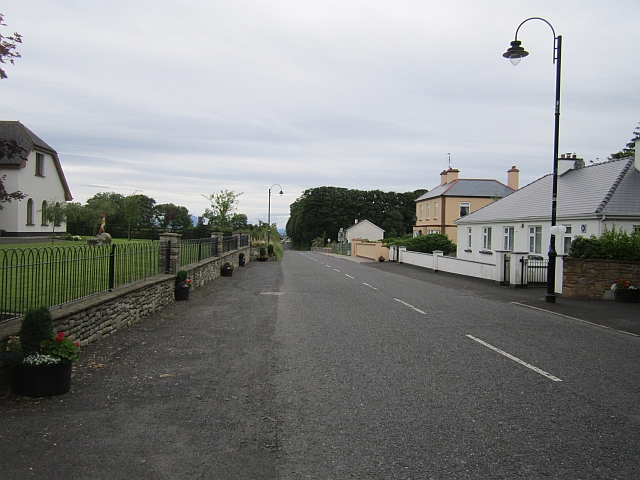
Street in Bunnyconnellan (Bonniconlon)

Bonniconlon, officially Bunnyconnellan (Irish: Muine Chonalláin), is a village in the barony of Gallen in north County Mayo, Ireland. The village is on the R294 regional road to the east of Ballina, County Mayo, and close to the Ox Mountains.

Bonniconlon is made up of two townlands, Bonniconlon East and Bonniconlon West.

The village has an old church, a Gaelic Athletic Association hall and playing pitch, a town hall, two pubs, three shops and a graveyard. The old school house, which was used for local meetings and events, was located between the newer school and the church.

== See also ==
- List of towns and villages in the Republic of Ireland
