= Battle of Arklow (1649) =

Coordinates: 52.7941°N 6.1649°W

- Part of the Cromwellian Conquest of Ireland
Date	1 November 1649
Location	Near Arklow, County Wicklow
Result	Commonwealth victory

Belligerents
Commonwealth of England	Royalists; Irish Confederation

Commanders and leaders
Maj. Nelson	Earl of Inchiquin; Earl of Carlingford

Strength
500 Cavalry; 1,500 Infantry	2,500 Cavalry

Casualties and losses
Low	Low

Ireland and Arklow

The Battle of Arklow was a minor skirmish that took place at Glascarrig on the coast road near Arklow in County Wicklow on 1 November 1649. It was fought between the army of the Parliamentarians and the combined forces of the Irish Royalists and Confederates during the Irish Confederate Wars.

== Background ==
By late October 1649, the Irish had suffered a number of major defeats at the hands of the army of the English Parliament – a defeat at the Battle of Rathmines and the loss of the important towns of Drogheda and Wexford. Ormonde was keen to regain the initiative. In October, he received word from Castlehaven that a column of English soldiers was preparing to march from Dublin to Wexford to reinforce Cromwell's troops in the south. This presented the Irish leadership with a chance to engage the Parliamentarians without risking too many soldiers.

The Baron of Inchiquin and Theobald Taaffe (who had fought on opposite sides at the Battle of Knocknanuss only two years before) were given command of a force of 2,500. This operation was of particular importance to the credibility of Inchiquin: he was distrusted by the majority Catholic population of Ireland due to a number of atrocities he had committed in the previous years of fighting, and in the autumn of 1649 many of the Protestant soldiers in Munster formerly loyal to him had mutinied and joined with the forces of Parliament. He now had a chance to regain some standing; it was more or less Inchiquin's last throw of the dice.

The English soldiers under Major Nelson left Dublin in the last days of October. As the Parliamentarians proceeded through the Wicklow Mountains they were harassed by tories although these attacks did not substantially hinder the force. In the meantime, Inchiquin prepared an ambush a little to the south of the town of Arklow where the hills come close to the sea. A log barricade was placed across the road to Wexford and infantry men were deployed behind it or otherwise concealed by the roadside. Nelson, however, heard a rumour that an ambush was planned and moved his force using a more roundabout route, hoping to avoid Inchiquin's army.

Inchiquin realised what was happening and swiftly moved his cavalry to intercept the Parliamentarians. Most of Nelson's infantry, however, could not keep up and consequently did not take part in the fighting.

== The battle ==
As Inchiquin's mounted force came into view, the English hurriedly deployed on a beach, their backs to the sea. As the Royalist and Irish forces ordered themselves in preparation for an attack, the Parliamentarian horse charged, hoping to catch the enemy by surprise, but were successfully repulsed on two occasions. After the second failed charge, Inchiquin launched a counter-assault with his cavalry on the Parliamentarian horsemen. Demoralised and outnumbered, the Parliamentarian horse fled back towards the infantry, with the Royalists and Irish in pursuit. The disciplined Parliamentarian infantry opened up their ranks to allow their own horse to pass through, after which the gaps in the ranks were closed once more. Inchiquin's charging cavalry now unexpectedly found that the retreating horse had disappeared, to be replaced by a mass of pike-heads and levelled musket barrels. (Note: Esson's The Curse of Cromwell: A History of the Ironside Conquest of Ireland states that the Irish forces were driven off by light cannon fire, but this is not mentioned in Cromwell's report to the Speaker of the English Parliament or Ludlow's The Battle of Glascarrig.) Close range musket fire tore into the Royalist-Irish cavalry, throwing them into disorder and leaving the beach bloodstained. The Parliamentarian cavalry then counter-attacked, forcing the Royalist-Irish forces to retreat. Nelson then resumed his march to Wexford unmolested.

== Consequences ==
The Battle of Arklow was a relatively small battle and the failure of the Irish forces to cripple Nelson's New Model Army was a demoralising setback but little more. For Inchiquin, however, the consequences were more serious. The battle had presented an opportunity for him to regain the trust of his countrymen, both Catholic and Protestant. His failure to defeat the numerically smaller English force left Inchiquin disgraced. After the battle, Inchiquin returned to Munster, where there were still a number of companies loyal to him. These forces, however, were routed by Broghill in March the next year. Shortly afterwards Inchiquin fled to the continent.

== See also ==
- Irish battles
