= Theobald Taaffe, 1st Earl of Carlingford =

Irish soldier and politician (1603–1677)

Theobald Taaffe, 1st Earl of Carlingford (c. 1603 – 31 December 1677), known as 2nd Viscount Taaffe, of Corren and 2nd Baron of Ballymote between 1642 and 1661, was an Irish Royalist officer who played a prominent part in the Wars of the Three Kingdoms. Following the outbreak of the Irish Rebellion of 1641, the Catholic Taaffe remained loyal to the authorities in Dublin. He later joined the Irish Confederates, and was awarded command of the Munster Army. Taaffe was a supporter of the moderate faction, and strongly supported an alliance between the Confederates and Irish Royalists. After the Cromwellian conquest of Ireland, Taaffe accompanied Charles II in exile. Following the Restoration, he was created 1st Earl of Carlingford.

== Biography ==
Theobald was the eldest of Sir John Taaffe's, 1st Viscount Taaffe of Corren, fifteen children. His mother was Anne Dillon, daughter of Theobald Dillon, 1st Viscount Dillon. Theobald succeeded his father to the viscountcy in 1642.

He represented County Sligo in the Parliament of Ireland from 1639 until his elevation to the peerage.

Theobald Taaffe was appointed to lead the Irish Munster army by Donagh MacCarthy, Viscount Muskerry in 1647. He was not an impressive commander, failing to prevent the sack of Cashel and then leading the Munster army to defeat at the battle of Knocknanauss in 1647. He had an antiquated sense of chivalry - before Knocknanuss he suggested to Baron Inchiquin, the enemy general, that the battle should be decided by 1000 hand-picked men from each side. Inchiquin's reply was sarcastic: you have performed as much as I desire in bringing your army hither, I shall not desire you to lose any advantage you have in numbers of men, being your offer was only made for recreation.

As fate would have it, Taaffe and Inchiquin fought on the same side at the Battle of Arklow two years later. Unfortunately for Taaffe, Inchiquin lost this time.

With the defeat of the Royalist cause in Ireland, Taaffe went into exile with Charles II. He was the ninth on the list of people excluded from pardon in the Act for the Settlement of Ireland 1652 as leaders of the Royalist forces in Ireland.

Following the Restoration of Charles II, he was created Earl of Carlingford.

He was sent on missions to the Duke of Lorraine and to the Holy Roman Emperor, by which was established the connection of his family with the house of Habsburg and Lorraine, which continued to the end of the Habsburg monarchy. Critics said that he had no qualifications for the position except a capacity for drink.

He was married twice, firstly to Mary Weld, daughter of Humphrey Weld (of Lulworth), by whom he had a son, The Hon. John Taaffe, who married Lady Rose Lambart, daughter of Charles Lambart, 1st Earl of Cavan, and secondly to Anne Pershall, without issue. He also had a daughter by Lucy Walter named Mary Crofts (The Hague, 1651–1693), whose father some sources claim to have been Theobald Taaffe, 1st Earl of Carlingford and others Henry Bennet, 1st Earl of Arlington. Mary married firstly William Sarsfield and had female issue, and married secondly William Fanshawe (b. The Hague, May 1651), and had issue.

Peerage of Ireland
| New creation | Earl of Carlingford; 1661–1677 | Succeeded by Nicholas Taaffe |
| Preceded by John Taaffe | Viscount Taaffe; 1642–1677 | Succeeded by Nicholas Taaffe |
