= Corann =

Túath in County Sligo, Ireland

- Túath/ Tríocha Céad
- History
  - Created: uncertain
  - Abolished: 1564
  - Succeeded by: Barony of Corran, County Sligo
- Status: Túath
- Contained within
  - Confederation: Iochtar Connacht
- Subdivisions
  - Type: Parishes/Townlands

Corann was an ancient Irish túath in north Connacht represented now by the present barony of Corran in County Sligo. The name is derived in legend from Corann, the harper of Dian Cecht of the Tuatha Dé Danann.

== Organisation ==
Ballymote became the centre of the túath after construction of Ballymote Castle in the 13th century.

== History ==
The well of Corann that alternated between sweet water and salt in time with the ebb and flow of the tide.

It was first shired as part of the new County Sligo by the English Lord Deputy Sir Henry Sidney in 1564.
