= Titles Deprivation Act 1917 =

Act of the Parliament of the United Kingdom

Titles Deprivation Act 1917 (Note: Section 4(1).)
- Act of Parliament
- Parliament of the United Kingdom
- Long title: An Act to deprive Enemy Peers and Princes of British Dignities and Titles.
- Citation: 7 & 8 Geo. 5. c. 47
- Territorial extent: United Kingdom

Dates
- Royal assent: 8 November 1917
- Commencement: 8 November 1917 (Note: The Acts of Parliament (Commencement) Act 1793.)

Status: Current legislation

Text of statute as originally enacted

Revised text of statute as amended

Text of the Titles Deprivation Act 1917 as in force today (including any amendments) within the United Kingdom, from legislation.gov.uk.

The Titles Deprivation Act 1917 (7 & 8 Geo. 5. c. 47) is an act of the Parliament of the United Kingdom which provided authority for enemies of the United Kingdom during the First World War to be deprived of their British peerages and royal titles.

== Background ==
The British royal family was closely related to many of the royal and princely families of Germany. In particular, when Victoria became queen in 1837, the Kingdom of Hanover (formerly the Electorate of Hanover), which had been in personal union with the British crown for over a century, passed to her uncle the Duke of Cumberland, who also retained his British titles and princely rank. Similarly, Queen Victoria married Prince Albert of Saxe-Coburg-Gotha, whose German titles passed eventually to the descendants of their youngest son Leopold, Duke of Albany. Thus, during World War I, both Ernest Augustus, Crown Prince of Hanover, 3rd Duke of Cumberland and Teviotdale, and Charles Edward, Duke of Saxe-Coburg and Gotha, were British princes and dukes, even while they were also officers in the German Army (as was the latter's son, Ernest Augustus, Duke of Brunswick, who also held British princely rank).

In Parliament, beginning on 18 November 1914, Swift MacNeill, a Protestant Irish Nationalist and constitutional scholar and MP for South Donegal, condemned the Duke of Albany and the Duke of Cumberland and Teviotdale as traitors and demanded to know "what steps will be taken to secure that [they] shall no longer retain United Kingdom peerages and titles and a seat in the House of Lords." Despite meeting resistance from Prime Ministers Asquith and Lloyd George, MacNeil continued his campaign until he lost his seat in the 1918 election. After MacNeill lost his seat, Horatio Bottomley, Member for Hackney South, took up the charge.

On 13 May 1915, King George V struck the names of seven German and Austrian royals (some of whom had never been British) from the roll of Knights of the Most Noble Order of the Garter; but peerage titles cannot be withdrawn except by Act of Parliament. In 1917, therefore, Parliament passed the Titles Deprivation Act authorising the deprivation of peerage titles, as well as princely dignities.

== Special committee of the Privy Council ==
The act allowed the King to establish a committee of the Privy Council, which was to include at least two members of the Judicial Committee of the Privy Council. The committee was empowered to take evidence and report the names of British peers or princes "who have, during the present war, borne arms against His Majesty or His Allies, or who have adhered to His Majesty's enemies". The report would then be laid before both Houses of Parliament; if neither House passed a motion disapproving of the report within forty days, it was to be submitted to the King, and the people named would lose their British titles.

Thereafter, a successor of a person that was deprived of a peerage would be allowed to petition the Crown for the restoration of a deprived title; the petition would be referred to a committee of the Privy Council, which would recommend whether the petitioner be reinstated or not. In no event, however, did the act "affect the title or succession of any person to any estates or other property".

Under the act, the King appointed to the committee:

- Lord Finlay (Lord Chancellor)
- Lord Sandhurst (Lord Chamberlain of the Household)
- The Marquess of Lansdowne
- The Marquess of Crewe
- Lord Newton
- Lord Stamfordham (Private Secretary to the Sovereign)
- Lord Sumner (a Lord of Appeal in Ordinary)

The committee was established by an Order in Council issued by the King on 27 November 1917.

The committee issued its report on 1 August 1918 and it was then laid before the Houses of Parliament. Since no resolution was passed by either House disapproving of the report, it was presented to the King on 28 March 1919, and on the same date, the King issued an Order in Council depriving the persons listed in the committee's report of their titles.

== List of titles affected by the act ==
By the King's Order in Council of 28 March 1919, the following people were deprived of their titles (names listed in the form given in the Order in Council):

- His Royal Highness Charles Edward, Duke of Albany, Earl of Clarence and Baron Arklow
- His Royal Highness Ernest Augustus, Duke of Cumberland and Teviotdale, and Earl of Armagh
- His Highness Prince Ernest Augustus of Cumberland (son and heir-apparent of the Duke of Cumberland)
- Henry, Viscount Taaffe of Corren and Baron of Ballymote

In addition to the Dukedom of Albany and the Dukedom of Cumberland and Teviotdale (the latter title being represented by two of the four people above), the title of Viscount Taaffe was also lost by its bearer. The Viscounts Taaffe had emigrated from Ireland to Austria in the 1700s and had served the Austrian emperor since that time, even while their Irish title was confirmed as recently as 1860.

No descendant of the Dukedom of Albany or the Dukedom of Cumberland and Teviotdale has ever petitioned the Crown for the revival of their titles. The last heir to the Viscount Taaffe title, Richard Taaffe, also had not petitioned the Crown before his death in 1967, when the title became extinct.

== See also ==
- Acts of attainder, the previous remedy for treason
