= Francis Taaffe, 3rd Earl of Carlingford =

Irish-born army commander and politician

Francis Taaffe, 3rd Earl of Carlingford (1639 – August 1704), was 4th Viscount Taaffe, of Corren, and 4th Baron of Ballymote and an army commander and politician of Irish descent in the service of Emperor Ferdinand III in the Austrian capital Vienna and later of Duke Charles IV of Lorraine in Nancy.

== Life ==
Francis Taaffe was born at Ballymote in County Sligo, Ireland, the third son of Theobald Taaffe, 1st Earl of Carlingford (who, following the Battle of Worcester had accompanied King Charles II of England in exile in 1652), and Mary (née White), Countess of Carlingford. After the death of his elder brother, Francis received the titles of Earl of Carlingford and Viscount Taaffe, both belonging to the Peerage of Ireland.

By the agency of King Charles, Francis Taaffe studied at the University of Olomouc in Moravia, and became a page at the Imperial court in Vienna. He began a military career as a commander in the Imperial forces during the Franco-Dutch War and became a most intimate friend of the Lorrainian duke Charles IV, who from 1670 had to cope with the occupying troops of King Louis XIV of France.

Taaffe rose to the rank of Field Marshal, having greatly distinguished himself at the 1683 Battle of Vienna and in other campaigns of the Great Turkish War, and was a member of the Order of the Golden Fleece. Lord Carlingford was sent on many important diplomatic missions, and at the end of his life was chancellor and chief minister to Duke Leopold of Lorraine.

== Family ==
In 1676, he married Helena Maximiliana von Traudisch. He died without children in August 1704 in Nancy, where he is buried at the Cathédrale Notre-Dame-de-l’Annonciation et Saint-Sigisbert in Nancy.

== Notes ==
Peerage of Ireland
Preceded by Nicholas Taaffe	Earl of Carlingford; 1690–1704	Succeeded by Theobald Taaffe
