= Ballymote =

Town in County Sligo, Connacht, Ireland

Ballymote Baile an Mhóta
- Town
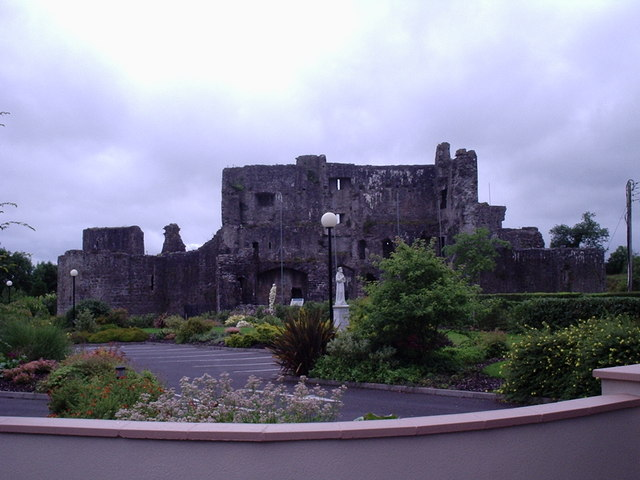
- Ballymote Castle

- Location in Ireland
- Coordinates: 54°05′23″N 8°31′00″W
- Country: Ireland
- Province: Connacht
- County: County Sligo
- Elevation: 69 m (226 ft)

Population (2022)
  - Total: 1,711
- Time zone: UTC+00:00 (WET)
  - Summer (DST): UTC+01:00 (IST)
- Eircode routing key: F56
- Telephone area code: +353(0)71
- Irish Grid Reference: G662150

Ballymote (Irish: Baile an Mhóta, meaning 'town of the motte/mound') is a market town in southern County Sligo, Ireland. It is around 20 km south of Sligo town in the province of Connacht, which is in the north-west of Ireland. Ballymote lies in the barony of Corran. It is a commuter town with a strong history of independent enterprises along with firm local health, school, and transport services. Ballymote is on the main Dublin to Sligo Train Line, and 10 minutes from the N4 / N17 roads. The town serves a large hinterland area in south east County Sligo.

The Norman Ballymote Castle dates from the 1300s, and the Book of Ballymote was written in or near the town in the 1390s.

== History ==
The origins of the settlement appear to have been derived from the 12th century Norman Castle, though evidence of earlier settlement and farming in area from c. 1000 BC exists through the presence of ringforts, cairns, and archaeological remains.

Ballymote was much affected by the disruption of the full conquest of Ireland by the English and Protestant settlers in the early modern period (1536–1691). Ballymote was ravaged several times in the 16th century and finally burned to waste. In 1608 King James I granted an estate encompassing the castle and area around the town to James Fullerton, this was soon to pass to the Taaffes. Following litigations, court action and a forced sale John Fitzmaurice (Lord Shelburne) bought the Ballymote estate in 1753. (Note: Other sources note Shelburne bringing in weavers from 1849, while Chambers states Shelburne bought the estate in 1745.)

On coming to Ballymote, Shelburne found the land mostly uncultivated with the inhabitants, all Roman Catholic, making no attempt to manufacture goods but subsisting on herding cattle. Shelburne made a start to establish Ballymote as a centre for the linen industry in County Sligo, by provisioning cottages for Protestant weavers and spinners brought in from Ulster. Expansion was slow, and with Shelburne's death in 1761 his widow attempted to progress his project through managers, expanding from 20 to 60 looms. In 1774 the younger son, Thomas Fitzmaurice, after studying the linen business, began the modern expansion of the town, with the construction of a bleach mill, workers houses, and Earlsfield House, a residence for himself. In 1776 it was noted that Fitzmaurice had invited architect James Paine to plan a redevelopment of the town with a new street layout, a market house and other associated houses. No records exist of Paine's plans, and it is not clear if his designs were implemented. By 1799, it was recorded that most of the inhabitants of Ballymote were weavers. Linen production peaked in the period from 1815 to 1820, but went into steep decline by the 1840s. Within the history of planned industrial settlements centred around the linen industry in Ireland, this was one of the later attempts with the manufacturing of linen in the town ultimately abandoned.

In 1833, the ownership of the town was transferred from the Fitzmaurices to the Gore-Booth family of Lissadell, who has established a corn mill in the town in 1795. In 1837, the town consisted of 140 houses on a single main street at the junction of six roads, and was owned by Robert Gore-Booth. A map from 1847 shows the core layout of the current town established.

=== Annalistic references ===
From the Annals of the Four Masters:

- M1300.3.The castle of Ath-Cliath-an-Chorainn (i.e.of Ballymote) was commenced by the Earl.
- M1317.5.The castle of Ath-cliath an Chorainn (i.e. of Ballymote) was demolished.

== Geography ==
Ballymote lies 24 km south-east of Sligo Town and 193 km west from Dublin. Caves of Keash are located 5 km south of the town

== Demography ==
In 1900 Ballymote had a population of 1,145, compared to 1,711 in 2022.

== Economy ==
In addition to a selection of shops and services, there are factories just outside the town at Ballybrennan, and a small business park at Carrownanty on the R296 Road to Tobercurry. There is a livestock mart and a microbrewery. The wider area is mainly agricultural, with many people commuting to Carrick on Shannon and Sligo town for work.

== Sport ==
A number of sports are played in the town, including Gaelic football and athletics at Corran Park and soccer at Brother Walfrid Memorial Park. The town had a nine-hole golf course on the outskirts of the town since 1943 (though some claim 1930s), which relocated c. 1993, and which closed in 2019 as financially unviable with dwindling membership.

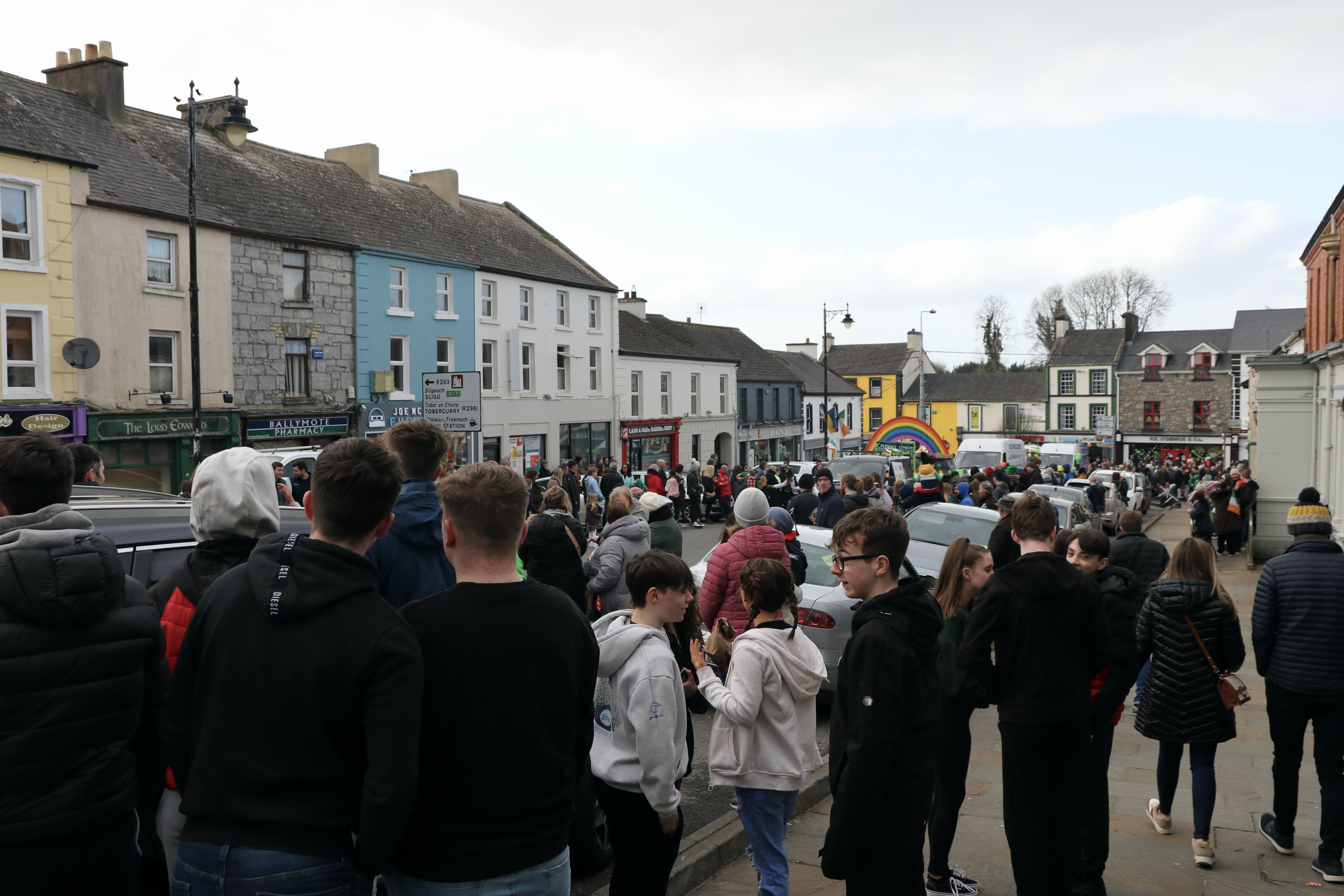
St Patricks day 2022

== Heritage and culture ==
The Ballymote Heritage Group was founded on 30 May 1984. At the bank holiday at the beginning of August they organise a heritage weekend with a variety of events and an annual publication, The Corran Herald.

The Irish Raptor Research Centre near Templehouse Lough was originally set up for research purposes but from 2003 demonstrated the fun and educational Eagles Flying Show as well. Eagles Flying announced its closure in 2025.

A children's playground was created at Ballymote Town Park but closed in 2018. It was upgraded and reopened by Ballymote Community Council in 2025. A miniature railway was previously in operation there on some summer weekends.

The town regularly host St Patricks day parades each year.

== Landmarks ==
=== Buildings ===
It is a historic town, with Ballymote Castle, the last and the mightiest of the Norman castles in Connacht. This castle, dating from 1300, was built by Richard de Burgh. It also has a Market House, a three-bay, two-story building formerly used by the South Sligo Adult Community Mental Health team of the Health Service Executive.

There has been a library in the town since 1949; originally run from the Loftus Hall, it was relocated to the former courthouse in 1984 before moving in 2011 to its current location on Teeling Street.

Temple house is located approximately 2 km from the town.

=== September 11 memorial ===
The Mayor of New York City, Michael Bloomberg, unveiled Ireland's national monument to the 69th Infantry Regiment (aka The Fighting 69th) and Michael Corcoran in Ballymote on 22 August 2006. At the foot of the monument is a piece of steel from the World Trade Center in New York, which was attacked on September 11, 2001. The steel was donated by the family of a local man who died in the attack.

== Transport ==
Ballymote lies on regional roads R293, R295 and R296, and on the main Dublin to Sligo railway line. Ballymote railway station opened on 3 December 1862. local link bus services are provided daily.

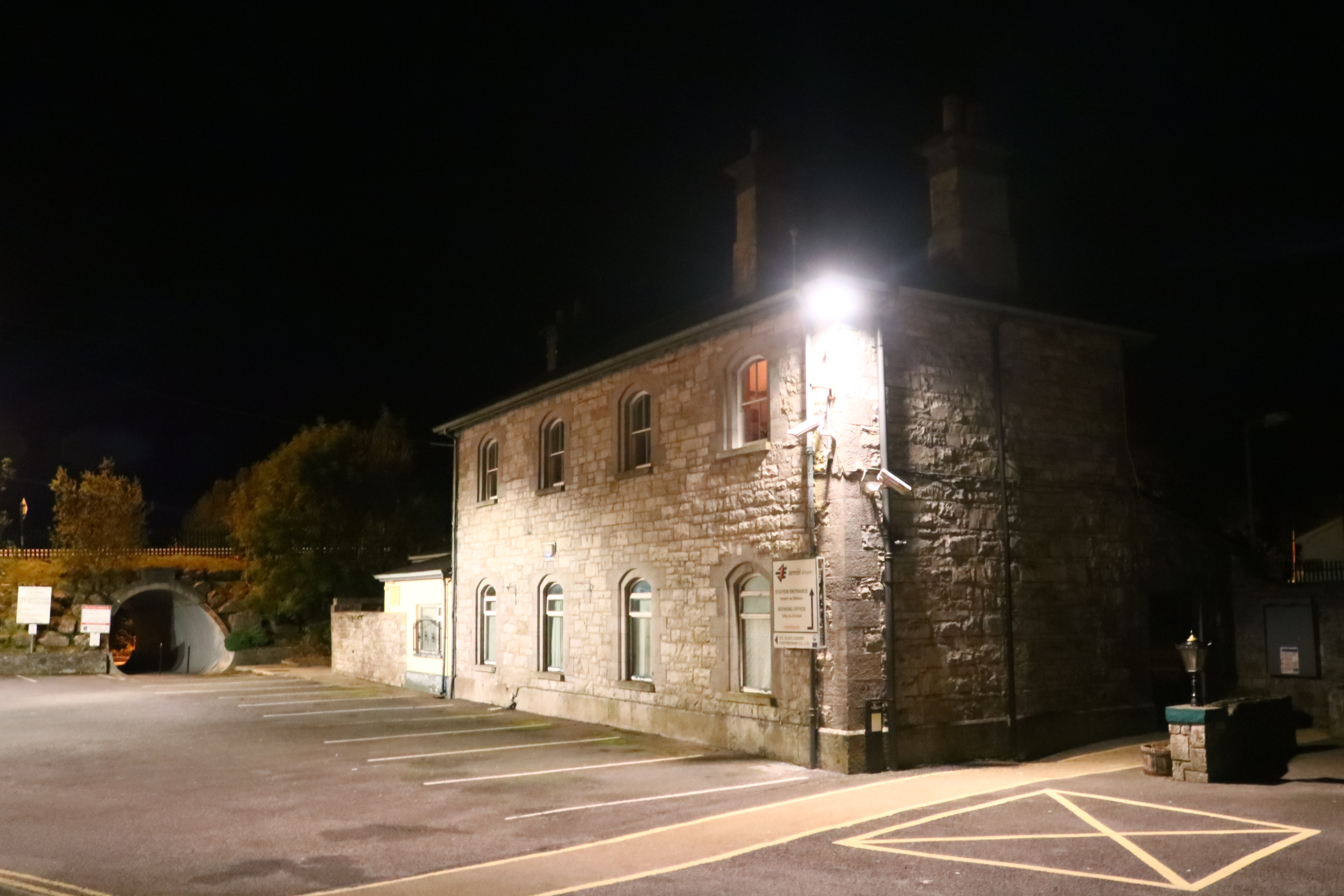
Ballymote train station

The town is also served by Ireland West Airport that is located approximately 30 minutes away.

== People ==
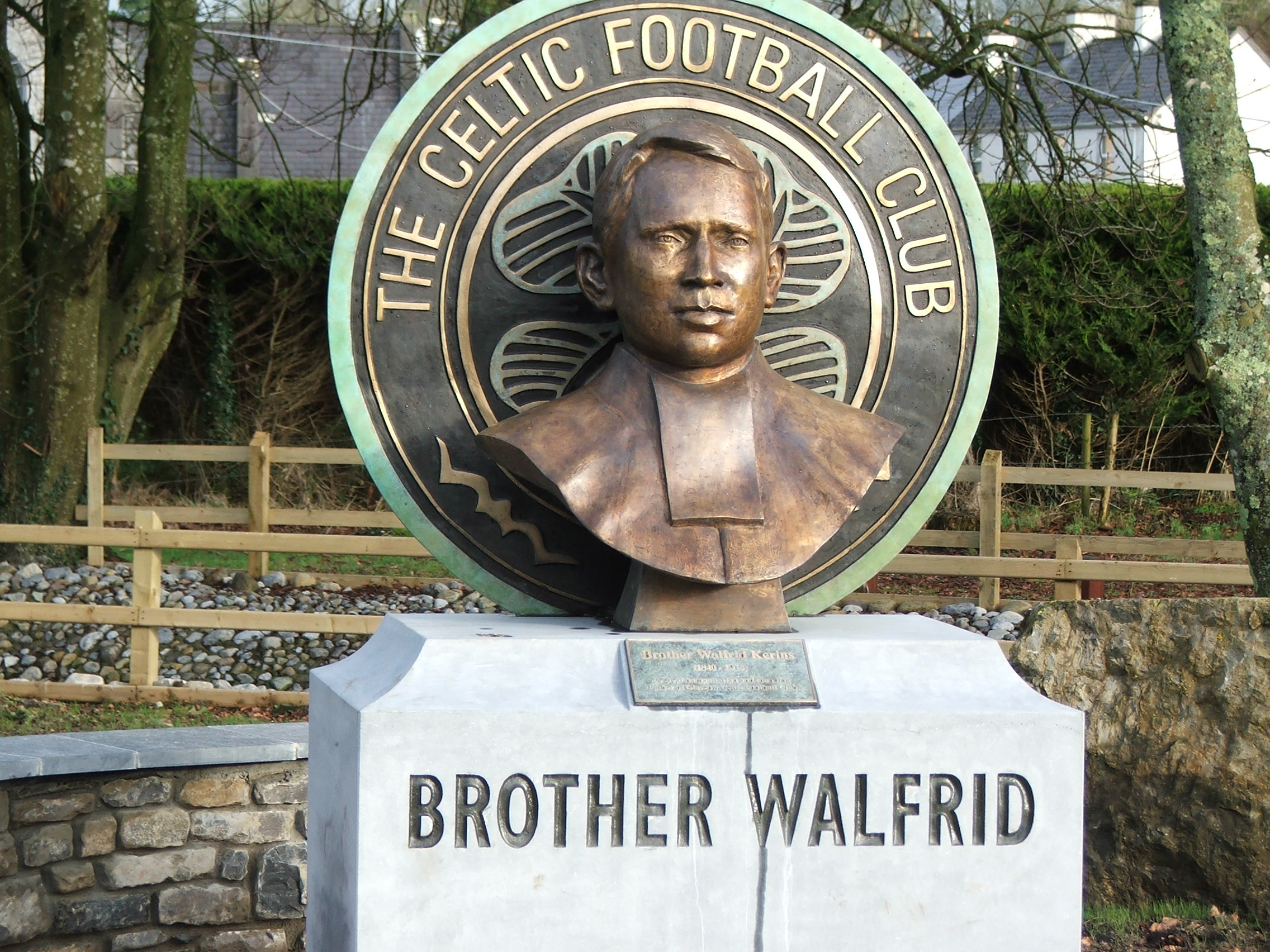
Commemorative sculpture of Brother Walfrid

Some well-known people from Ballymote and the surrounding areas include:

- Feldmarschall The 3rd Earl of Carlingford (1639–1704). Born in Ballymote, Lord Carlingford became the head of an old Hiberno-Norman family. He was a senior-ranking commander in the Imperial Army and the Army of the Holy Roman Empire, the armed forces of the Habsburg dynasty. (Note: Habsburg has been commonly and incorrectly spelled Hapsburg in many sources.)
- Michael Corcoran, brigadier general of the 69th Infantry Regiment during the American Civil War.
- Paddy Killoran (1903–1965), one of the finest exponents of the South Sligo Style of Fiddle playing (born near Ballymote).
- Sophia McColgan, recipient of the 1998 Irish Person of the Year award on behalf of her family for her courage in bringing a familial abuse story to public attention.
- John Perry, a TD in the 28th to 31st Dáil and Minister of State at the Department of Jobs, Enterprise and Innovation from 2011 to 2014.
- Eamon Scanlon, a Senator in the 22nd Seanad and a Teachta Dála in the 30th and the 32nd Dáil.
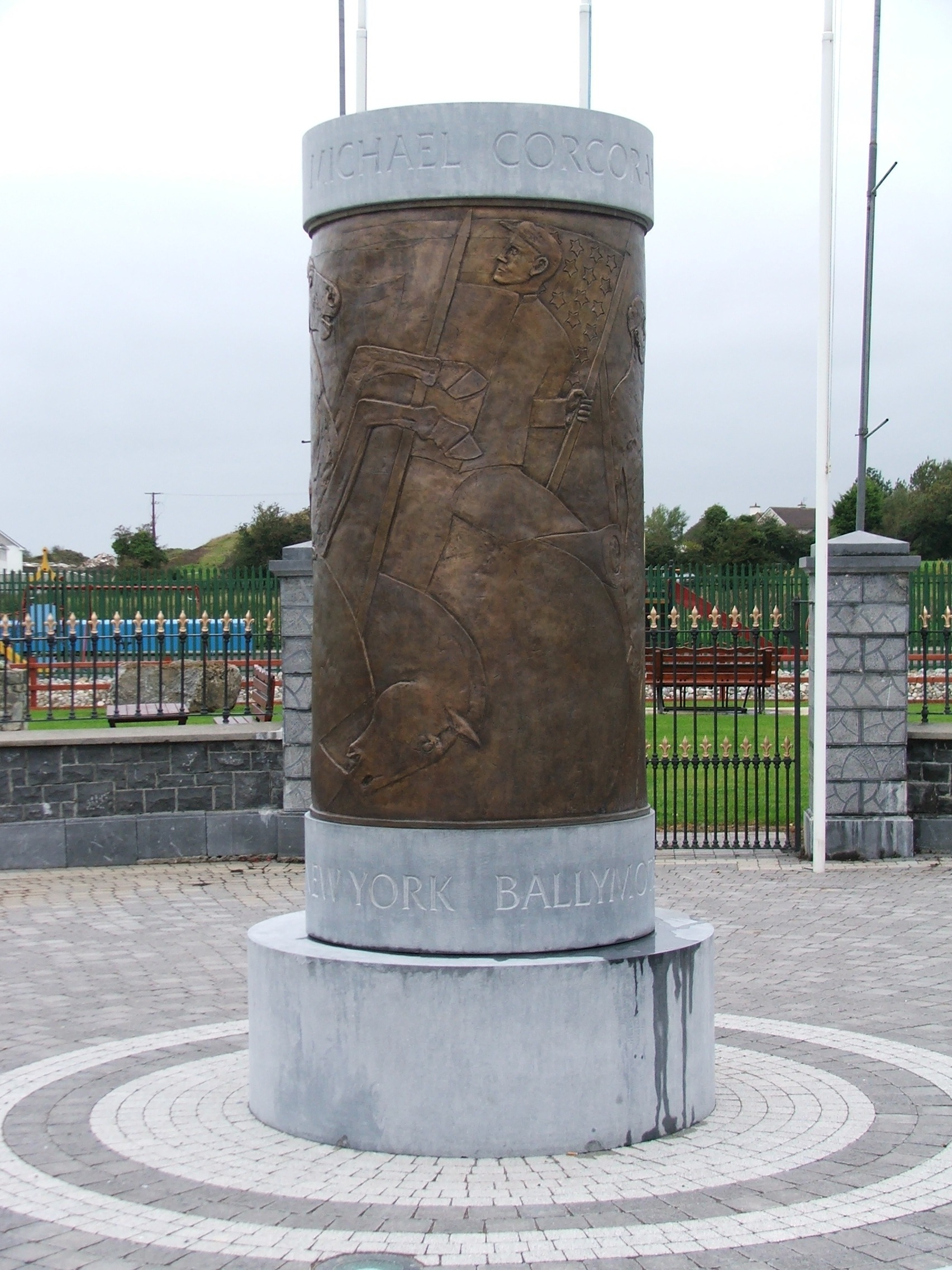
- Ireland's National Monument to Fighting 69th in Ballymote
  Feldmarschall Nicholas Graf von Taaffe and 6th Viscount Taaffe (1685–1769). Born in Ballymote, the Graf was a cousin of The 3rd Earl of Carlingford. He was a senior-ranking military commander in the Holy Roman Empire (also known as the Austrian Empire).
- James Sreenan former Chief of Staff of the Irish Defence Forces
- Brother Walfrid (AKA Andrew Kerins), the founder of Glasgow Celtic Football Club.

== See also ==
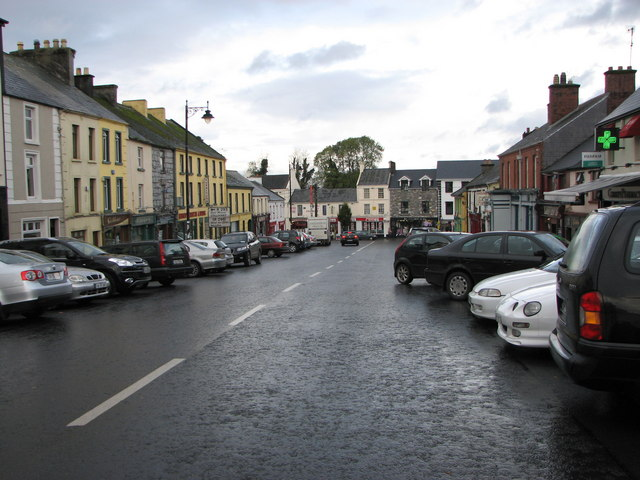
Lord Edward Street, Ballymote

- List of towns and villages in the Republic of Ireland
- List of market houses in the Republic of Ireland
- Henry Taaffe, 12th Viscount Taaffe
