= Denis Taaffe =

- Born: c.1759
- Died: 30 July 1813 (aged 53–54)
- Writing career
- Pen name: Julius Vindex

Denis Taaffe or Dennis Taafe (bapt. 1759, Clogher, County Louth; d. 1813, Dublin) was an Irish political writer and historian also known under the pseudonym Julius Vindex, and a veteran of the 1798 Rebellion. He wrote extensively against the notion of England having had a civilising mission in Ireland.

Educated in Franciscan colleges and in Prague, Taaffe was ordained a Roman Catholic priest in 1782. In 1788 objection to his excessive drinking caused him briefly to become a Church of Ireland clergyman. But he soon encountered the same problems. A linguist, with knowledge of Irish, Greek, Latin, Hebrew, French, Italian, German and Dutch, Taaffe was, with difficulty, able to support himself in Dublin as a teacher and translator.

Taaffe was sympathetic to the democratic views of the United Irishmen and, as they despaired of overturning the Protestant Ascendancy in Parliament, of their turn toward insurrection. In the 1798 Rebellion he fought with the Wexford rebels at several engagements including the Battle of Ballyellis (29 June 1798) in which the rebels almost annihilated a detachment of the British Fencibles (the Ancient Britons). Though wounded, he managed to escape. Taaffe, however, did not support United Irishmen in their hopes of French assistance. Had the French managed to conquer Ireland, he suggested they would readily have traded it for a West Indian sugar island.

In 1799, as editor of The Shamroc, a patriotic newspaper, and as the author of pamphlets, that railed against the prospective Act of Union, Taaffe was arrested for seditious libel. Taaffe continued to argue for a reformed Irish legislature, that "by dispensing equal justice and impartial laws, could cement the people by the ties of a common interest and a common country" (Shamroc, 15 Feb. 1799).

In 1801 he published Vindication of the Irish nation and particularly its catholic inhabitants from the calumnies of libellers, a scathing attack on England's supposedly civilising mission. It was a theme he furthered developed in Succinct views of catholic affairs in reply to McKenna's thoughts (1805) and in A defence of the catholic church, against the assaults of certain busy sectaries (1808). He dismissed the charges of barbarism and heresy advanced by English writers against the Irish and their church.

In December 1806 Taaffe became a founder and secretary of the Gaelic Society, which aimed to investigate and revive ancient Irish literature, publish Irish historical and literary documents, and develop the literary and ecclesiastical history of Ireland. This work contributed in to An impartial history of Ireland, from the period of the English invasion to the present time in four volumes (1809–11). It was denounced, in a published counterblast, by the loyalist cleric John Graham as "false and traitorous". Taaffe's history rejected religion as the principal cause of division in Ireland, insisting that the real cause "clashing interests and national antipathies necessarily subsisting between a conquering and an oppressed nation".

Citing David Hume's History of England (1754–62) as a case in point, Taaffe argued that British writers on Irish affairs had generally "brandished the pen of defamation with a mind no less hostile than that of the warrior yielding the sword in battle"(Impartial history, i, p. iv).

Taaffe died 30 July 1813 in Dublin, reconciled to the Catholic Church, and was buried in an unmarked grave in the churchyard of St James's church.

== Works ==
- The probability, causes, and consequences of a union between Great Britain and Ireland, 1798
- "Julius Vindex", Vindication of the Irish Nation, and particularly its Catholic Inhabitants from the Calumnies of Libellers, 1801
- An Address to the Roman Catholic Nobility and Gentry of Ireland (1804)
- Succinct views of catholic affairs in reply to McKenna's thoughts (1805)
- A defence of the catholic church, against the assaults of certain busy sectaries (1808)
- An impartial history of Ireland from the period of the English invasion to the present time, 4 vols., 1809–11. Available at Internet Archive
