= Richard Taaffe =

Irish gemmologist

Edward Charles Richard (Graf von) Taaffe (1898–1967), known as Richard, was an Irish gemmologist who found the first cut and polished taaffeite in November 1945.

== Biography ==
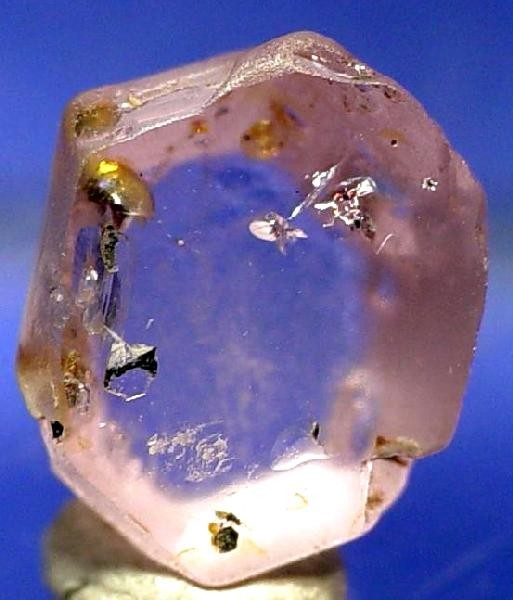
Taaffeite

Taaffe was born and grew up on the Bohemian estate of Ellischau (today Nalžovské Hory), the family seat. For a short time, the composer Ralph Benatzky was his tutor.

He was the son of Count Henry Taaffe, 12th Viscount Taaffe, an Austrian landowner, and Maria Magda Fuchs; his grandfather was the Austrian Prime Minister Eduard Taaffe. His father had once held hereditary titles from two different countries: he was a Count (Graf) of the Holy Roman Empire and a viscount in the Peerage of Ireland. Richard Taaffe, however, inherited neither the viscountcy, which was suspended by the Titles Deprivation Act 1917, as his father had served on the Austrian side in World War I, nor the title of Count, as Austria had generally abolished titles of nobility in 1919. Taaffe was nonetheless almost always referred to in English-speaking countries as count.

In the years after World War I, Richard Taaffe emigrated to the Irish Free State and worked there as a gemologist. In October 1945, he discovered the very rare mineral taaffeite (Mg 3 Al 8 BeO 16, also known as magnesiotaaffeite, 2N'2S ), which was later named after him: Taaffe had a large number of old cut gems obtained from the Dublin jeweller Robert Dobbie, extracted from old jewellery. Upon close examination, Taaffe found that a spinel-derived purple stone originating from Sri Lanka had a birefringence that was absent in a spinel. Unable to explain this phenomenon, Taaffe sent the stone to B. W. Anderson in the London Chamber of Commerce's laboratory. After extensive analysis, it was finally recognized that the stone was an unidentified mineral, which was confirmed in 1949 by the discovery of a second specimen.

With Richard Taaffe's death in 1967, no heirs to either title remained and both the Austrian and the Irish titles became extinct.

Peerage of Ireland
Titles in pretence
Preceded by Count Henry Taaffe	— TITULAR — Viscount Taaffe; 1928–1967	Extinct
