= Heinrich, Count of Taaffe =

Austrian landowner (1872–1928)

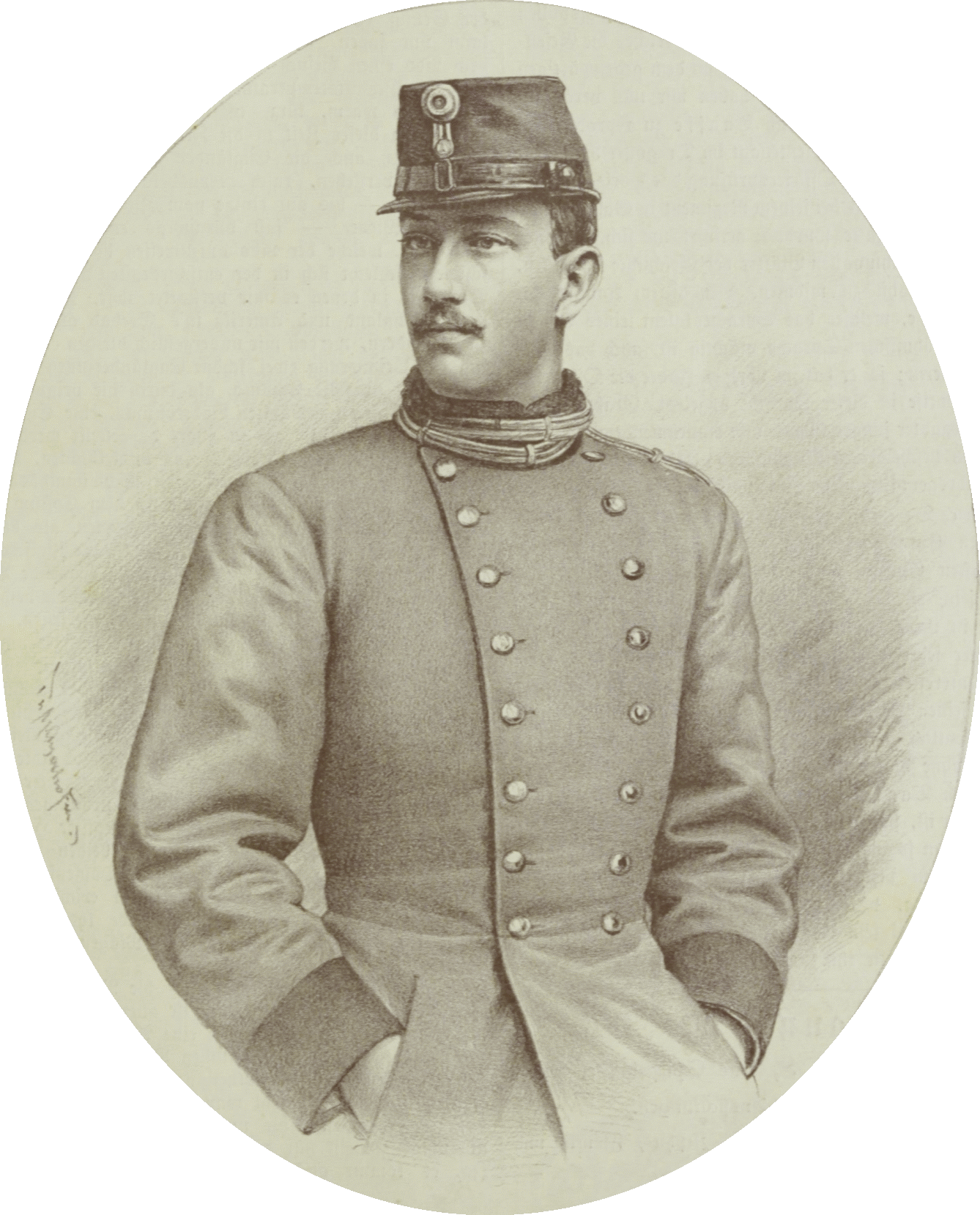

Heinrich Graf von Taaffe, 12th Viscount Taaffe (22 May 1872 – 25 July 1928) was an Austrian landowner who, until 1919, held hereditary titles from two different countries: he was a Count (Graf) in the nobility of Austria and a viscount in the Peerage of Ireland.

== Biography ==
He was born at Innsbruck, the son of Eduard, Count of Taaffe, 11th Viscount Taaffe, who had served as Minister-President of Austria from 1879 to 1893, and his wife, Countess Irma Csáky (1833–1895), member of the Hungarian nobility. Under the Titles Deprivation Act 1917, his name was removed from the roll of the Peers of Ireland by Order of the King in Council on 28 March 1919 for bearing arms against Britain in World War I.

On 28 April 1919, he lost his title as a Count of Austria-Hungary as well when the newly established Republic of Austria abolished nobility and outlawed the use of noble titles.

He married on 22 May 1897, in Vienna, Maria Magda Fuchs; they had a son: Richard (1898–1967). Upon the death of his first wife on 3 January 1918, he remarried to Aglaë Isescu on 22 June 1919 at Ellischau.

He died in Vienna in 1928, aged 56.

== See also ==
- Taaffe

Peerage of Ireland
Preceded by Eduard Taaffe	Viscount Taaffe; 1895–1919	Deprived of title
Titles in pretence
Loss of title Titles Deprivation Act 1917	— TITULAR — Viscount Taaffe; 1919–1928	Succeeded by Richard Taaffe
