= William Shaw Mason =

Irish statistician

William Shaw Mason (1774–1853) was an Irish statistician and bibliographer. Amongst his works was A Statistical Account or Parochial Survey of Ireland.

== Life ==
He graduated B.A. at Trinity College, Dublin, in 1796. With two others, he was appointed by patent in 1805 to the office of remembrancer or receiver of the first-fruits and twentieth parts in Ireland; and also in September 1810 to the post of secretary to the commissioners for public records in Ireland. He died in Camden Street, Dublin, on 11 March 1853.

== Works ==
Sir Robert Peel, while chief secretary to the lord-lieutenant of Ireland, encouraged Mason to undertake an Irish statistical work similar to that of Sir John Sinclair for Scotland. The first volume of Mason's publication was issued at Dublin in octavo, with maps and plates, in 1814, under the title of A Statistical Account or Parochial Survey of Ireland, drawn up from the communications of the clergy. The second volume appeared in 1816, and a third followed in 1819.

Mason compiled a Survey, Valuation, and Census of the Barony of Portnahinch in Queen's County. This was printed in 1821 in a folio volume, and submitted to George IV during his visit to Ireland, as a model for a statistical survey of the whole country.

A catalogue of books relating to Ireland, collected by Mason for Sir Robert Peel, was printed under the title of Bibliotheca Hibernicana, Dublin, 1823. Returns by him on the statistics of Ireland were in the sessional papers of the House of Commons.
