= Smarmore Castle =

Modified medieval castle in County Louth, Ireland

Coordinates: 53.81437905°N 6.56561111°W

Smarmore Castle is an Irish Medieval castle located south of Ardee in County Louth.

== History ==
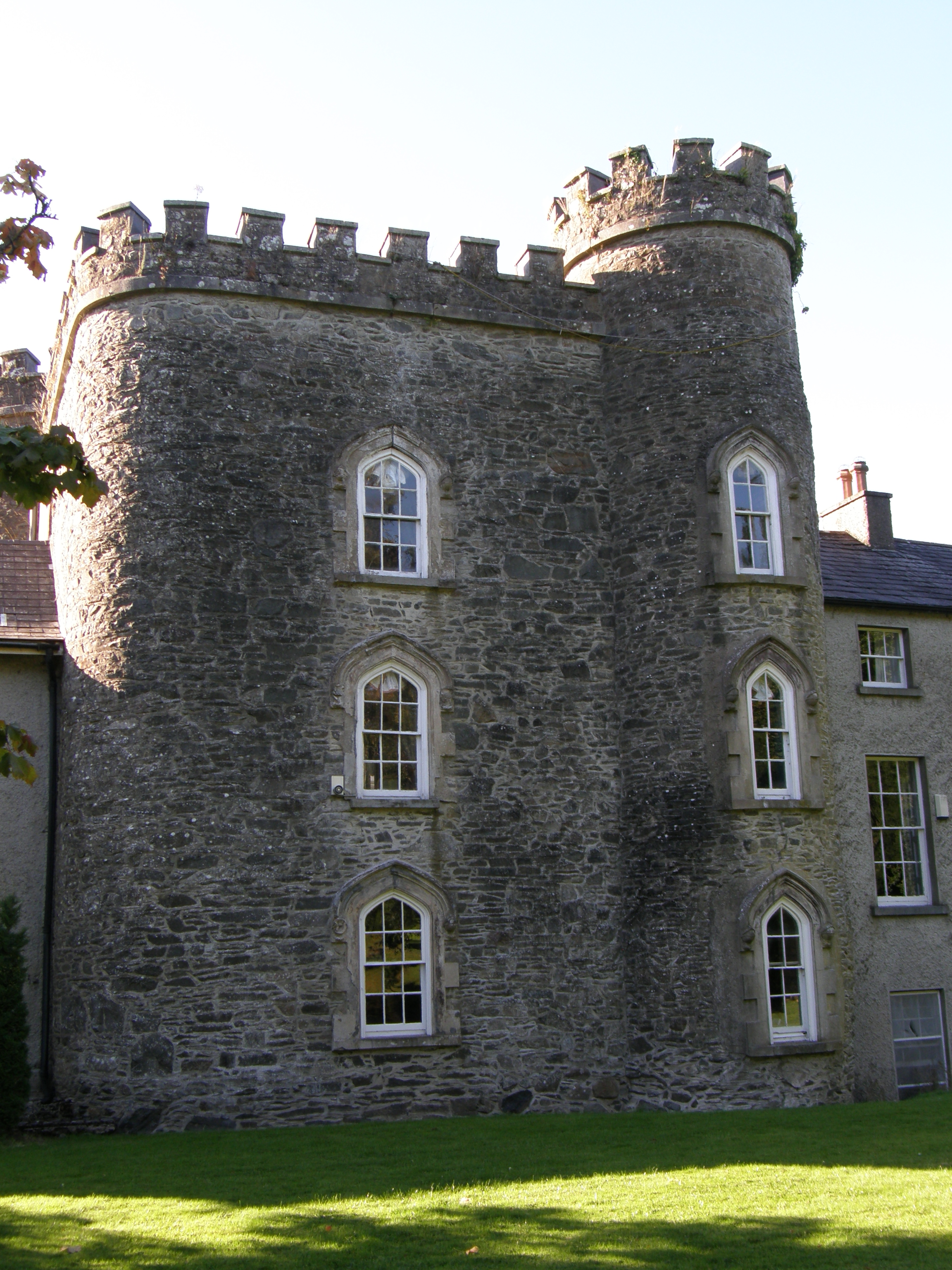
Smarmore Castle, County of Louth, Ireland. First mention in 1320. Was the seat of the Taaffe family for centuries. Since 2016, the castle has been an addiction treatment centre.

Smarmore Castle was first officially mentioned in 1320 as the seat of the Taaffe family.

The Taaffe family, originating from Pembrokeshire, Wales, lived in Smarmore Castle up to the 1980s. While the tower house was built in around 1320, other buildings of the castles have been established in 1730 to 1750. After the Taaffe family sold the castle it was converted into a guest house. In 2015, Castle Craig, a British Addiction Treatment Center, acquired Smarmore Castle. The Smarmore Castle Private Clinic, a drug and alcohol treatment centre, opened in 2016.

== Origin of name ==
The name Smarmore is seen to have its origin in an Irish language legend known as Táin Bó Cúailnge (The Cattle Raid of Cooley).
