= Corran (barony) =

Barony in County Sligo, Ireland

Corran An Corán (Irish)
- Barony
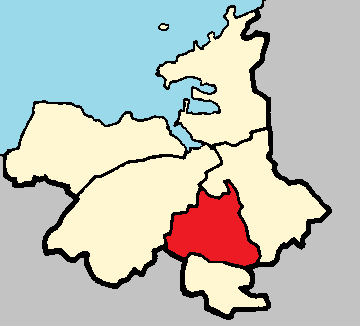
- Country: Ireland
- Province: Connacht
- County: Sligo

Area
  - Land: 183.6 km^{2} (70.9 sq mi)

Corran (An Corán) is a historic barony in south County Sligo in Ireland. It corresponds to the ancient túath of Corann.

The barony is centred broadly about the town of Ballymote. To the north and east lies the barony of Tirerril, to the east the barony of Leyny, and to the south the Barony of Coolavin. There is also a border to the south east with the barony of Boyle and to the south west with the Barony of Costello.

Francis Taaffe, 3rd Earl of Carlingford and 4th Viscount Taaffe of Corran was born in Ballymote in 1639.
