= R295 road (Ireland) =

Road in Ireland

R295 road
- Bóthar R295
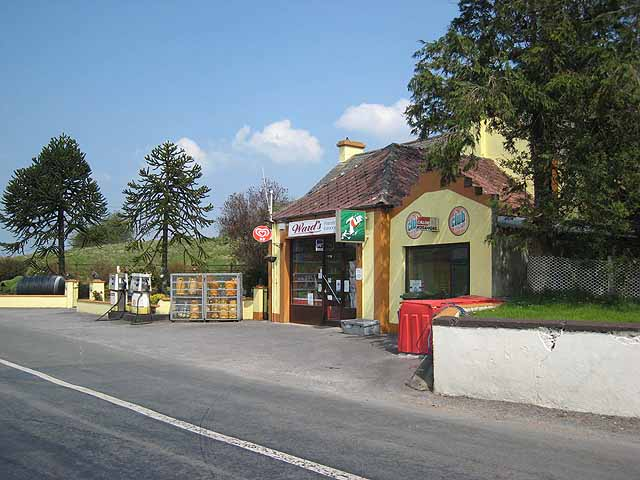
- Keash, County Sligo, on the R295 (in 2008)

Location
- Country: Ireland

Highway system
- Roads in Ireland; Motorways; Primary; Secondary; Regional

The R295 road is a regional road in Ireland that runs from Ballymote, County Sligo to Boyle, County Roscommon. From Ballymote the road passes by Feenagh lough and of past the Caves of Kesh. It continues by ascending over the Curlew Mountains before descending into Boyle from the west.

== See also ==
- Roads in Ireland
- National primary road
- National secondary road
