= Nicholas, Count of Taaffe =

Feldmarschall Nicholas Taaffe, Graf von Taaffe, 6th Viscount Taaffe and 6th Baron of Ballymote (about 1685 – 30 December 1769), was an Irish-born courtier and soldier who served the Habsburgs in Lorraine and Austria.

== Taaffe family ==
The first mention of the Taaffe family name appeared in Irish annals in the year 1284. Their seat was Smarmore Castle, located in County Louth, since 1320.

== Early life ==
Born at Crean's Castle in County Sligo, and brought up as a Catholic, Taaffe was the son of Francis Taaffe and Anna Maria Crean, and was a second cousin of the 5th Viscount Taaffe. He was educated in the Duchy of Lorraine and became the chancellor of Duke Leopold of Lorraine, father of the Holy Roman Emperor Francis I.

== Career ==
Taaffe entered the Habsburg Army, serving at Phillipsburg in Baden and in the campaign against France in 1734-5, the Turkish War of 1736-39, and was present in battle at Fort St. Elizabeth, Pallesch, and the Battle of Semlin.

He was promoted to Major-General (General Feldwachtmeister) in 1739. He also fought in the Silesian Wars against Prussia and distinguished himself, aged about 72, at Marshal Daun's victory of Frederick the Great at Kolin in 1757. He was Chamberlain to Emperor Charles VII and Empress Maria Theresa.

Taaffe had a distinguished career in the Habsburg Army; he eventually rose to the rank of a Feldmarschall (Field Marshal), and was created Graf von Taaffe (Count of Taaffe) by the Empress Maria Theresa.

He is said to have introduced the growing of the potato to Silesia in 1763.

== Irish estate ==
He succeeded to the peerage in 1738, but was challenged for his Irish estates by a Protestant relative, John Petty FitzMaurice, who claimed them under the Popery Act 1704 (2 Anne c. 6 (I)).

Earl of Carlingford's Estate Act 1741
- Act of Parliament
- Parliament of Great Britain
- Long title: An Act for vesting all the Manors, Towns, Lands, Chiefries, Fee-farm Rents, and other Hereditaments whatsoever, in the several Counties of Lowth, Meath, and Sligoe, and elsewhere, in the Kingdom of Ireland, late the Estate of Francis Earl of Carlingford, deceased, in Trustees, to be sold, for the Payment of his Debts, and other Purposes therein mentioned.
- Citation: 15 Geo. 2. c. 25 Pr.
- Territorial extent: Great Britain

Dates
- Royal assent: 16 June 1742
- Commencement: 1 December 1741 (Note: Start of session.)

Status: Current legislation

This led to a series of lengthy lawsuit. After several years, the situation was ended by a compromise, embodied in 1742 in a private act of Parliament, Earl of Carlingford's Estate Act 1741 (15 Geo. 2. c. 25 Pr.), by which the estates were sold in 1753.

One-third of the value (£25,000) was given to Nicholas Taaffe. With the money, he acquired the castle of Ellischau (Nalžovy) in Bohemia in 1769, shortly before his death; he had also inherited other property in the Habsburg dominions.

He was naturalised in Bohemia, and in 1738 inherited the title of Viscount Taaffe from a cousin. He left on record that the reason for becoming an Austrian was that he did not wish his descendants to be exposed to the temptation of becoming Protestants, so as to avoid the operation of the Penal Laws.

== Bibliography ==
- Spain, Jonathan. "Taaffe, Nicholas". Oxford Dictionary of National Biography (online ed.). Oxford University Press. doi:10.1093/ref:odnb/26907. (Subscription, Wikipedia Library access or UK public library membership required.)

Peerage of Ireland
Preceded by Theobald Taaffe	Viscount Taaffe; 1738–1769	Succeeded by Rudolph Graf von Taaffe
