= R296 road (Ireland) =

Road in Ireland

R296 road
- Bóthar R296
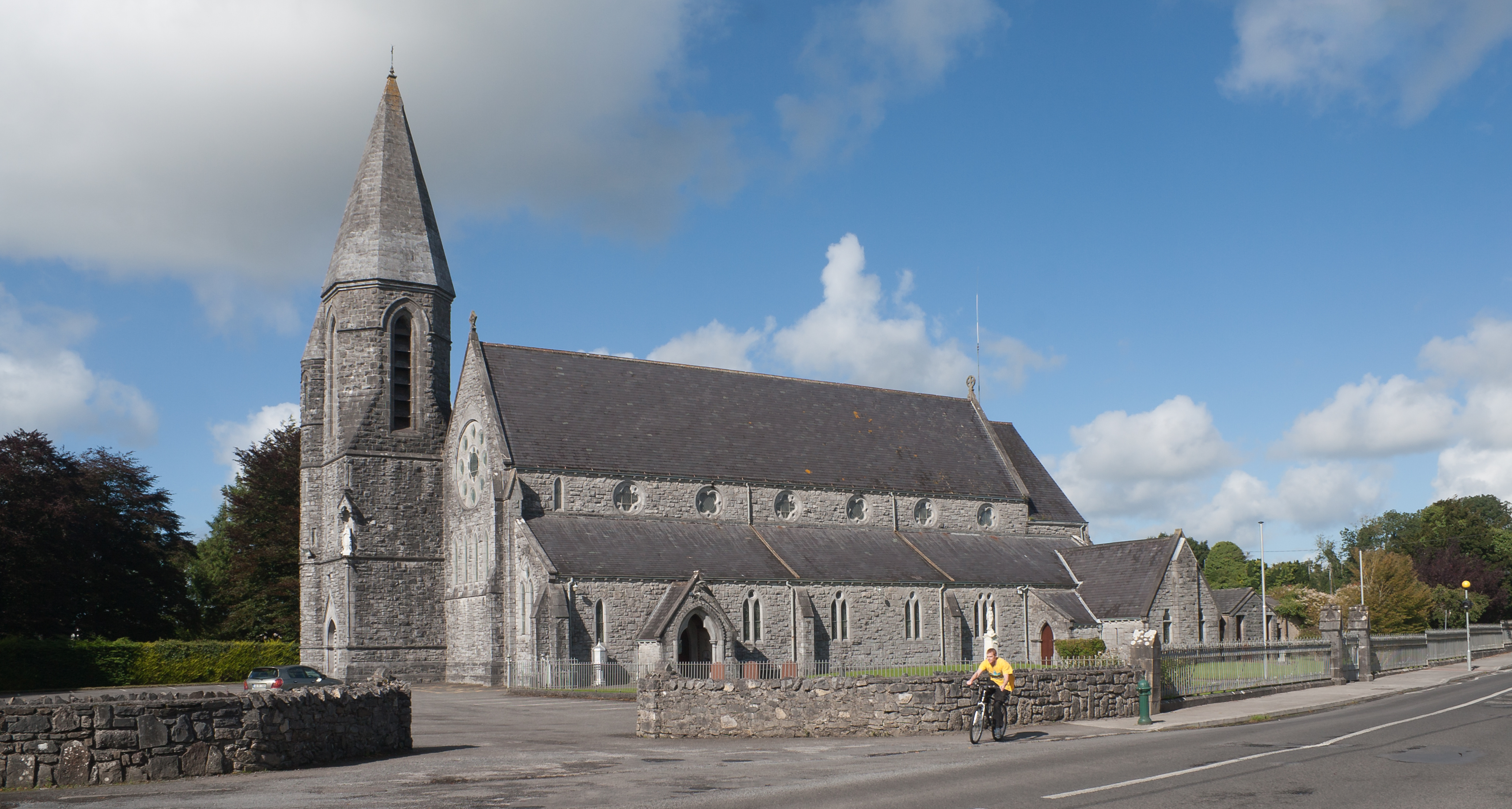
- Church of the Immaculate Conception, Ballymote, on the R296

Route information
- Length: 10.3 km (6.4 mi)

Location
- Country: Ireland
- Primary destinations: County Sligo; Ballymote; Cloonkeevy (Five Crossroads); Bunnanadden; Quarryfield; Joins R294 toward Tobercurry

Highway system
- Roads in Ireland; Motorways; Primary; Secondary; Regional

The R296 road is a regional road in County Sligo, Ireland that runs from Ballymote to Quarryfield where it merges into R294 road from Gorteen to Tobercurry.

It is the most direct route from Ballymote to Tobercurry.

== See also ==
- Roads in Ireland
- National primary road
- National secondary road
