= Viscount Taaffe =

Title in the Peerage of Ireland

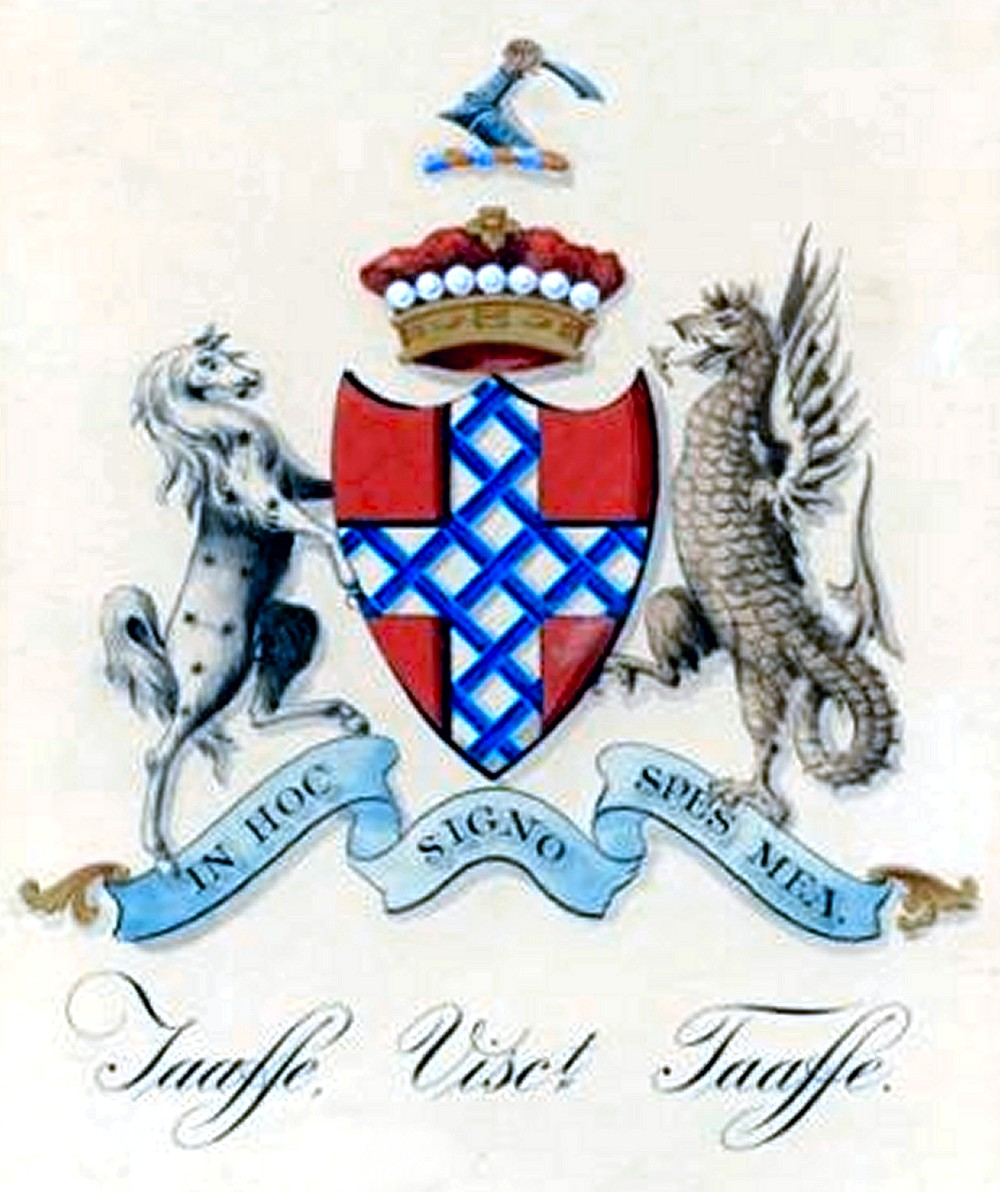
The Taaffe family arms

The title Viscount Taaffe, of Corren, was created in the Peerage of Ireland in 1628, together with the subsidiary title Baron Ballymote. From 1661 to 1738, the Viscounts Taaffe were also the Earls of Carlingford.

From the 18th century onwards, the holders of these titles mainly lived in the Holy Roman Empire and subsequently in the Austrian Empire, where they also held the title of Graf Taaffe (German: Count Taaffe), the continental equivalent of an Earl. In 1919, as a consequence of siding with the enemies of Britain in World War I, the viscountcy was one of only three primary titles (together with the royal dukedoms of Albany and Cumberland) to be forfeit under the Titles Deprivation Act 1917. Also in 1919, the family's Holy Roman Empire title was no longer recognised by the new Austrian Republic, along with all other Austrian noble titles. In any case, with the death of the 12th Viscount's heir in 1967, all these titles, and any claims to them, are now extinct.

== History ==
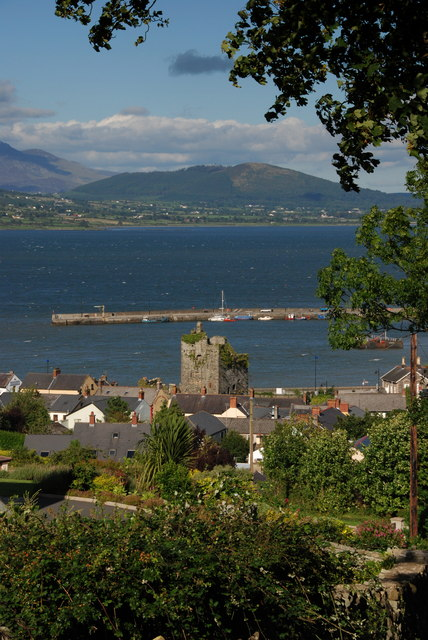
Taaffe's Castle and Carlingford Harbour Carlingford Lough and Mourne Mountains in background

=== The Taaffes in Great Britain and Ireland ===
From the 13th century, the Taaffes had been one of the leading families in the north of Ireland. Legend suggests that the whole Taaffe family moved from Wales (Britain) to Ireland around 1196; in Britain, they lived in the area currently known as Taff Vale. According to official Irish records, in 1320, William Taaffe had his seat at Smarmore Castle. Another branch of the family, which died out in about 1400, was based at Liscarton Castle in County Meath.

In 1628, Sir John Taaffe was raised to the Peerage of Ireland as Viscount Taaffe, of Corren, and Baron Ballymote. He left fifteen children, of whom the eldest, Theobald, who succeeded him as 2nd Viscount Taaffe, took a prominent part in the English Civil War and on the Restoration was created Earl of Carlingford. The 1st Earl was succeeded by his second son Nicholas, who had served in the Anglo-Spanish War, as 2nd Earl. He was killed at the 1690 Battle of the Boyne fighting for the former King James II of England against William III of Orange, when his title was attainted and his estates forfeited. Another son Fr. James Taaffe O.F.M., a Franciscan priest and teacher, served as papal nuncio to Ireland, chaplain to the exiled queen mother Henrietta Maria, in Paris.

=== The Taaffes in continental Europe ===
The 2nd Earl's younger brother, Francis, studied at the University of Olomouc (Olmütz) in the Imperial Margraviate of Moravia, and served at the court of Emperor Ferdinand III as well as under Duke Charles IV of Lorraine, whose most intimate friend he became. He rose to be a Field Marshal in the Habsburg Army, having greatly distinguished himself at the 1683 Battle of Vienna and in the other Turkish campaigns, and was a member of the Order of the Golden Fleece. He was sent on many important diplomatic missions, and at the end of his life was Chancellor and Chief Minister to the Duke of Lorraine. Despite the Jacobite connections of his family, Francis Taaffe was confirmed as 3rd Earl of Carlingford by King William III, and the attainder and forfeiture of the estates incurred by his elder brother was repealed. This favour he owed to his position at the court of the Holy Roman Emperor, William's most important ally in the Grand Alliance.

On the 3rd Earl's death, his titles and estates went to his nephew Theobald, who succeeded as 4th Earl. His father had fallen during the 1689 Siege of Derry, and he had himself served with distinction in the Habsburg Army.

On the 4th Earl's death in 1738, the Earldom of Carlingford became extinct; both the Imperial and Irish estates as well as the viscountcy of Taaffe went to a cousin, Nicholas, who succeeded as 6th Viscount while his Irish estates were claimed under the Popery Act 1704 (2 Anne (I) c. 6 (I)) by a Protestant heir, leading to a lengthy lawsuit. Like so many of his family, Nicholas Taaffe had been brought up in Lorraine, was Chancellor of Duke Leopold and joined the Habsburg Army; he fought in the Silesian Wars against Prussia. After years of fighting for his Irish estates, the case was ended by a compromise embodied in a private act of Parliament, Earl of Carlingford's Estate Act 1741 (15 Geo. 2 c. 25 Pr.) by which the estates were sold and one-third of the value given to Nicholas Taaffe. With the money he acquired the castle of Ellischau (Nalžovy) in Bohemia; he had also inherited other property in the Habsburg dominions. He was naturalised in Bohemia, and left on record that the reason for this step was that he did not wish his descendants to be exposed to the temptation of becoming Protestants so as to avoid the operation of the Penal Laws. Nicholas Taaffe had a distinguished career in the Habsburg Army; he eventually rose to the rank of a Field Marshal, and was created Graf von Taaffe (Count of Taaffe) by Empress Maria Theresa. The Taaffe family thus held titles of nobility from different countries, governed by different rules. While the Irish titles descended according to strict primogeniture, the title of Count was under Austrian and Holy Roman Empire law and applied equally to all male-line descendants of the original grantee in perpetuity; male family members were thus styled Graf, female family members were styled Gräfin.

With the Taaffes now living mainly in the lands of the Habsburgs, a Committee of Privileges of the House of Lords in 1860 recognized the right of the family to hold the Irish title.

Eduard Graf Taaffe, 11th Viscount Taaffe had a distinguished political career in the service of the Habsburgs and served for two terms as Minister-President of Austria under Emperor Francis Joseph I, leading cabinets from 1868 to 1870 and 1879 to 1893. Upon his death in 1895, his peerages passed to Heinrich Graf Taaffe, 12th Viscount Taaffe.

=== Loss of both titles ===
In World War I, Heinrich Graf Taaffe, 12th Viscount Taaffe and his family remained loyal to the Austrian monarch. Thus in 1919, the 12th Viscount was deprived of the viscountcy following the enactment of the Titles Deprivation Act 1917. Under the provisions of the Act, his heirs and successors were entitled to petition the British Crown for restoration of the title. However, on the death of his last male-line descendant Richard in 1967 no eligible heirs came forward and the title became extinct.

Independent of the legal situation in Britain, the monarchy was abolished in Austria on 12 November 1918, and on 28 April 1919 the newly established Republic of German-Austria under a coalition of the Social Democratic and Christian Social parties abolished all noble titles for Austrians through the Adelsaufhebungsgesetz, a law which still remains in effect. This meant that Heinrich Graf Taaffe was no longer recognised as such by the Austrian State, although in society circles and private newspapers, he still appeared as Count.

== Peerages ==
Each person listed is the son of his predecessor, unless otherwise noted.

=== Viscounts Taaffe (1628) ===
- John Taaffe, 1st Viscount Taaffe (died before 1641/2).
- Theobald Taaffe, 1st Earl of Carlingford, 2nd Viscount Taaffe (died 1677)
- Nicholas Taaffe, 2nd Earl of Carlingford, 3rd Viscount Taaffe (died 2 July 1690)
- Francis Taaffe, 3rd Earl of Carlingford, 4th Viscount Taaffe (1639–1704), son of the 1st Earl
- Theobald Taaffe, 4th Earl of Carlingford, 5th Viscount Taaffe (died 24 November 1738), grandson of the 1st Earl; the earldom became extinct with his death.
- Nicholas Graf von Taaffe, 6th Viscount Taaffe (c. 1685–1769), great-grandson of the 1st Viscount
- Rudolph Graf von Taaffe, 7th Viscount Taaffe (6 October 1762 – 7 June 1830), grandson of the 6th Viscount
- Francis John Charles Joseph Rudolph Graf von Taaffe, 8th Viscount Taaffe (23 May 1788 – 8 February 1849)
- Louis Patrick John Graf von Taaffe, 9th Viscount Taaffe (25 December 1791 – 21 December 1855), son of the 7th Viscount
- Charles Rudolph Francis Joseph Clement Graf von Taaffe, 10th Viscount Taaffe (26 April 1823 – 19 November 1873)
- Eduard Graf von Taaffe, 11th Viscount Taaffe (1833–1895), son of the 9th Viscount
- Heinrich Graf von Taaffe, 12th Viscount Taaffe (1872–1928), who had the viscountcy suspended in 1919

=== Successor to the claim ===
- Richard Taaffe (1898–1967), entitled to petition for restoration of the viscountcy, but never did so.

Viscounts Taaffe and Grafs Taaffe
- John Taaffe, 1st Viscount Taaffe (d. 1642)
  - Theobald Taaffe, 1st Earl of Carlingford (d. 1677)
    - William Taaffe, Viscount Taafe (bef. 1647—1673)
    - Nicholas Taaffe, 2nd Earl of Carlingford (d. 1690)
    - Francis Taaffe, 3rd Earl of Carlingford (1639—1704)
    - Major Hon. John Taaffe (d. 1689)
      - Theobald Taaffe, 4th Earl of Carlingford (d. 1738)
  - William Taaffe
    - Feldmarschall Nicholas Taaffe, 6th Viscount Taaffe, Graf von Taaffe (d. 1769)
      - Hon. John Philip Taaffe (1733—1765)
        - Rodolphus Taaffe, 7th Viscount Taaffe, Graf Taaffe (1762—1830)
          - Francis John Charles Joseph Taaffe, 8th Viscount Taaffe, Graf Taaffe (1788—1849)
          - Louis Patrick John Taaffe, 9th Viscount Taaffe, Graf Taaffe (1791—1855)
            - General Charles Rudoph Joseph Francis Taaffe, 10th Viscount Taaffe, Graf Taaffe (1823—1873) Irish titles recognised 1860
            - Edward Francis Joseph Taaffe, 11th Viscount Taaffe, Graf Taaffe (1833—1895)
              - Henry Taaffe, 12th Viscount Taaffe, Graf Taaffe (1872—1928) Titles deprived and abolished 1919.
                - Edward Charles Richard Taaffe (1898—1967)
      - General Hon. Francis Taaffe, Graf Taaffe (d. 1803)

== Bibliography ==
- Wurzbach, Biographisches Lexicon Österreichs. Memoirs of the Family of Taaffe (Vienna, 1856), privately printed
- Article in the Contemporary Review (1893), by EB Lanin.
- The Prague Politik published in December 1904 contains some interesting correspondence collected from Taaffe's papers.
