= Ardcarn =

Civil parish in County Roscommon, Ireland

Ardcarn Ard Carna
- Civil parish
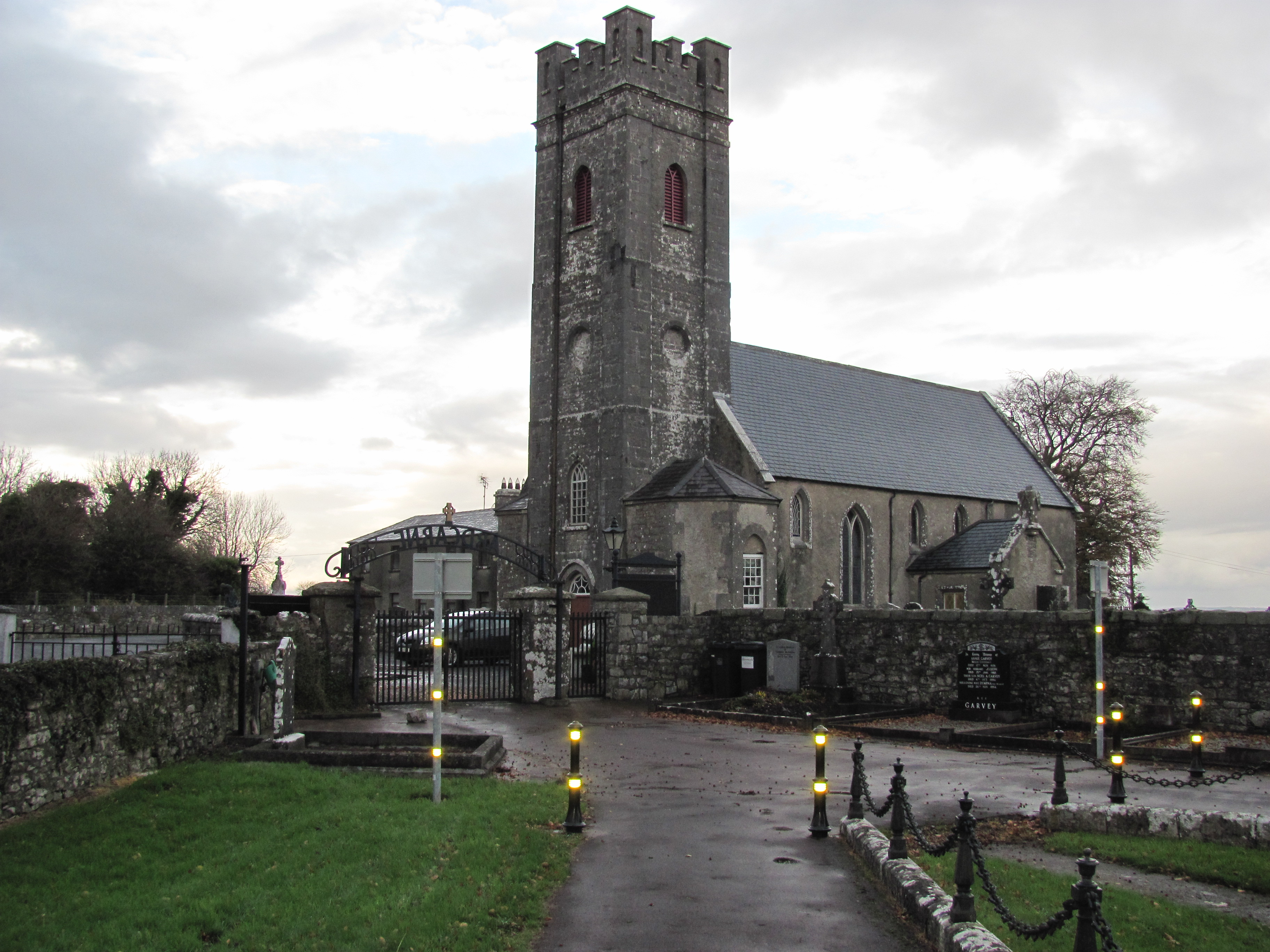
- Ardcarne Church (Church of Ireland)
- Interactive map of Ardcarn
- Coordinates: 53.968905°N 8.20492°W
- Barony: Boyle (barony)
- County: County Roscommon
- Country: Ireland

Ardcarn or Ardcarne (Irish: Árd-Carna, Árd-charna) is a civil parish in County Roscommon, Ireland, 8 km north-west of Carrick-on-Shannon.

== Name ==
The name Irish: Árd-Carna "Ardcarn" is derived from Old Irish. Irish: Árd means "height" or "high" (as in "of land"). Irish: Carn broadly refers to natural phenomenon such as a "hill", "mound", "natural stone pile", but also artificial features such as "stone piles", sepulchral monuments, and Megalithic tombs.

The townland of Ardcarn lies 91 metres above sea level. The Mound and Ringfort on this townland are national monuments in County Roscommon.

== Historical description ==
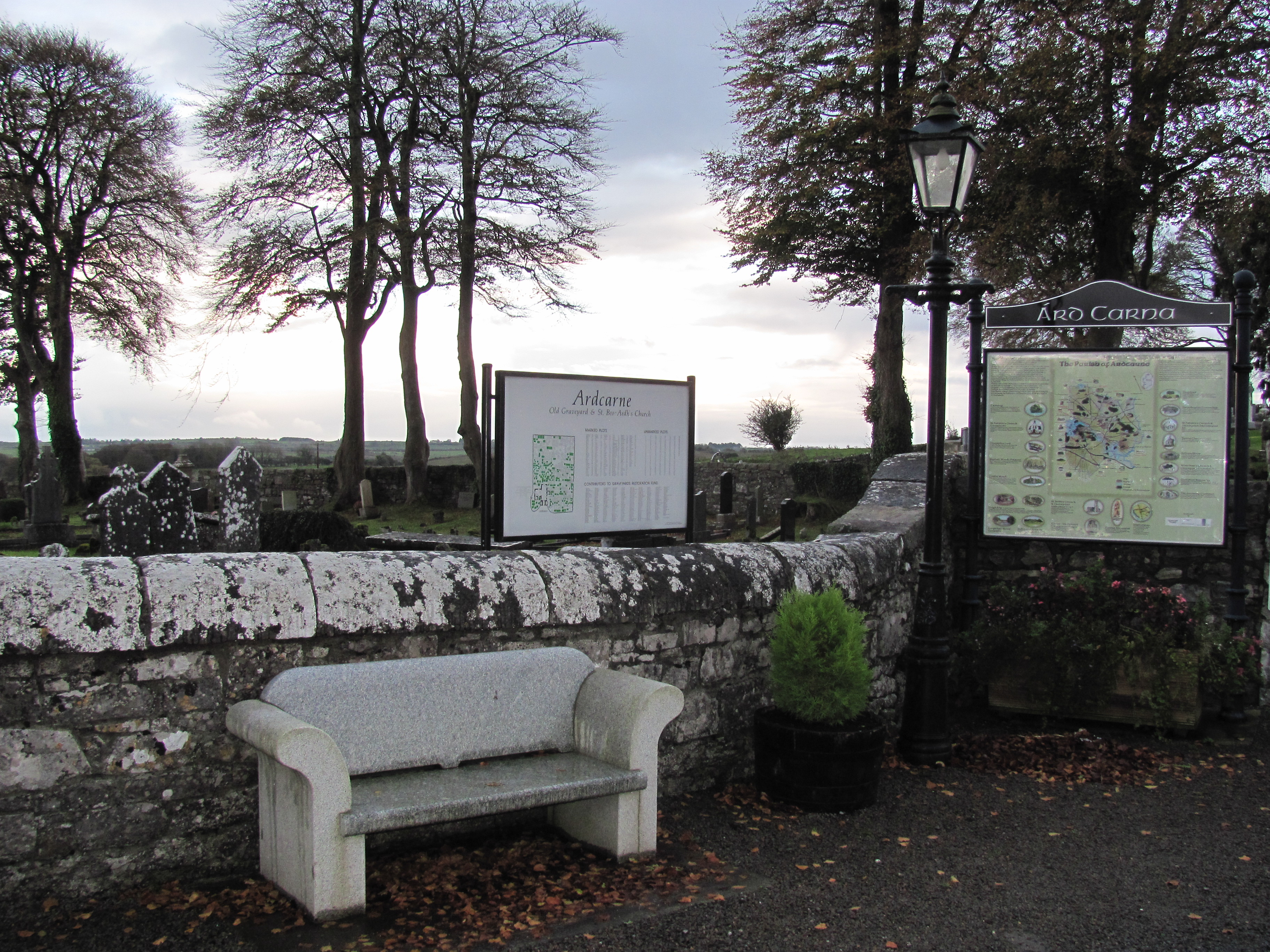
Entrance to graveyard (Ardcane Church)

A Topographical Dictionary of Ireland (1840) describes Ardcarn thus:

ARDCARNE, a parish, in the barony of Boyle, County Roscommon, province of Connaught, 3½ miles (E.S.E.) from Boyle, on the road to Carrick-on-Shannon; containing 7673 inhabitants.

An abbey of Regular canons was founded here, probably in the early part of the 6th century, of which, according to the Annals of the Four Masters, Beaidh died bishop in 523 : its possessions were granted, in the 89th of Elizabeth, to the Provost and Fellows of Trinity College, Dublin. Here was also a Benedictine nunnery, a cell to the abbey of Kilcreunata, in the county Galway; and at Knockvicar. Knockvicar was a monastery of the third order of Franciscans which at the suppression was granted with other possessions on lease to Richard Kendlemarch. The parish is situated on the shores of Lough Key: it is partly bounded by the Shannon on the east, and comprises 460 statute acres, as applotted under the tithe act.

The land is principally under an improving system of tillage; there is a considerable extent of reclaimable bog, and part of the plains of Boyle is included within the parish, Limestone and freestone of the best description for architectural purposes abound; indications of coal have been discovered on the lands of Ballyfermoyle, the property of W. Mulloy, Esq, where shafts have been sunk, but the operations are discontinued. The Boyle River runs through the parish, and a project is in contemplation to render it navigable from its junction with the Shannon, near Carrick, to Lough Gara. This river is crossed by a bridge at Knockvicar, where its banks are adorned with some pleasing scenery.

Rockingham House, the elegant mansion of Viscount Lorton, is beautifully situated on the south-east side of Lough Key, in a gently undulating and well-wooded demesne of about 2000 statute acres, tastefully laid out in lawns and groves descending to the water's edge: it is of Grecian Ionic architecture, built externally of marble, with a portico of six Ionic columns forming the principal entrance, on each side of which are corresponding pillars ornamenting the facade, and on the north side is a colonnade supported by six Ionic columns: adjoining the house is an extensive orangery, and numerous improvements have been made in the grounds by the present noble proprietor.

Oakport, the seat of W. Mulloy, Esq., is a large edifice in the ancient or Gothic style of architecture, occupying a beautiful situation on the margin of a large expanse of water formed by the Boyle river: the demesne comprises about 1200 statute acres, beautifully wooded, and from the inequality of its surface presents many picturesque and commanding views.

The other seats are Knockvicar, the residence of C. J. Peyton, Esq., and Mount Francis, of W. Lloyd O'Brien, Esq.

Petty sessions are held every Tuesday at Cootehall. That place was formerly called Urtaheera, or O'Mulloy's Hall, and was, early in the 17th century, together with the manor attached to it, the property of William, styled "the Great O'Mulloy"; but in the war of 1641 it came into the possession of the Hon. Chidley Coote, nephew of the first Earl of Mountrath, and from that family took its present name.

The parish is in the diocese of Elphin, and the rectory forms part of the union of Killuken: the tithes amount to £280. The church is an ancient structure, which was enlarged by a grant of £600 from the late Board of First Fruits, and the Ecclesiastical Commissioners have lately granted £234 for its further repair. The glebe-house was built by aid of a gift of £100 and a loan of £300 from the same Board, in 1807: the glebe comprises 20 acres (81,000 m^{2}), subject to a rent of £8.

In the Roman Catholic divisions the parish is also called Crosna, and comprises the parish of Ardcarne and part or that of Tumna, containing two chapels, situated at Cootehall and Crosna.

The parochial free school is supported by Lord Lorton, who built the school house at an expense of £120; and a school for girls is supported by Lady Lorton, and is remarkably well conducted: At Derrygra is a school aided by the Elphin Diocesan Society, to which the bishop gave a house and an acre of ground; and three Sunday schools are held in the parish, two under the patronage of Lady Lorton, and one under that of the Misses Mulloy, of Oakport.

A dispensary is maintained by Lord Lorton for the benefit of his tenantry; and another has been lately established at Cootehall, by the exertions of the Messrs. Mulloy, by whom and the other principal landed proprietors it is supported.

== Bishopric ==
As stated above, the only bishop of the monastic centre whose name is known is Irish: Beo-Aedh "Beaidh" (lit. Aedus Vivus), who died circa 518AD-523AD. Before the 12th century, the territory under the monastery's pastoral care was incorporated into the diocese of Elphin.

No longer a residential bishopric, Árd Carna is today listed by the Catholic Church as a titular see.
