= Shannon River Basin =

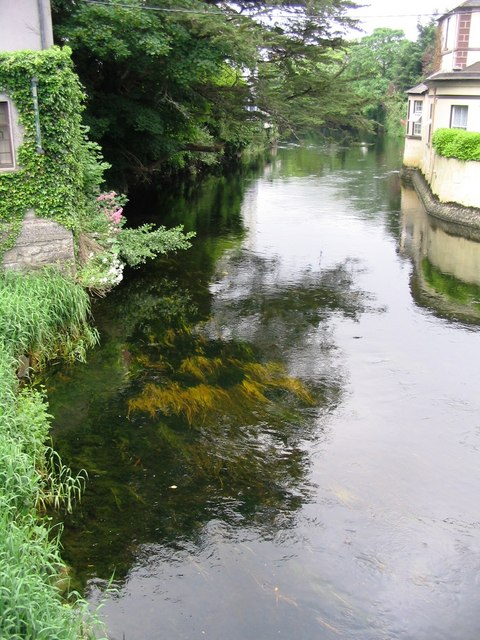
- River Fergus, Ennis

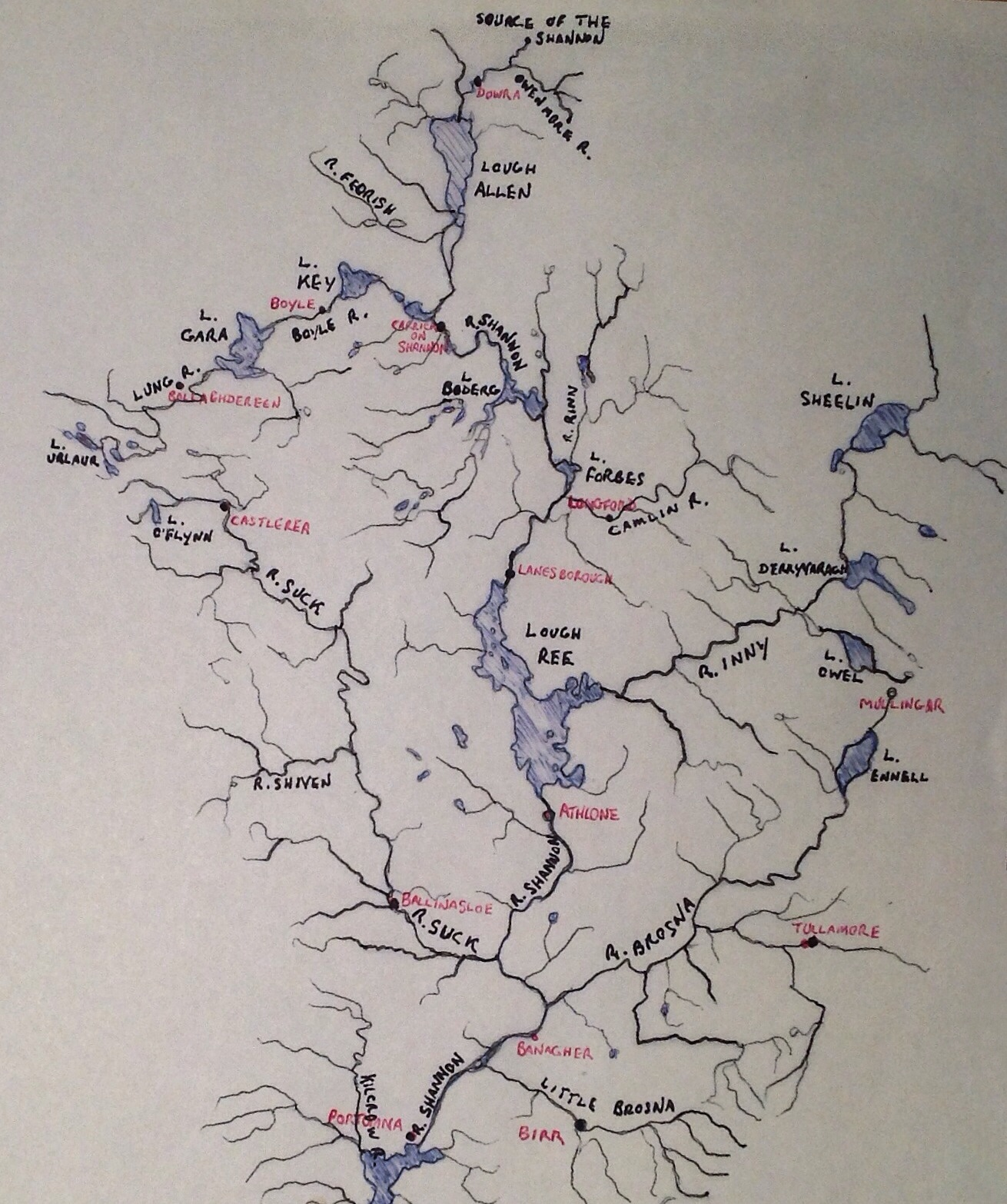
- Upper Shannon Basin

Location
- Country: Ireland

Physical characteristics
- Source
  - location: Shannon Pot
- Mouth
  - location: Loop Head
- Length: 224 m (735 ft)
- Basin size: 11,700 km2

Basin features
- River system: River Shannon
- Tributaries
  - left: Owenmore River (County Cavan)
  - right: Boyle River

The Shannon River Basin consists of the area containing Ireland's longest river, the River Shannon, and all of its tributaries and lakes. The official Ordnance Survey Ireland length of the Shannon from its Shannon Pot source is 224 miles (360 km) made up of 63.5 miles (102.2 km) tidal water flow and 160.5 miles (258.3 km) freshwater flow.

== Statistics ==
The Shannon Basin is Ireland's largest basin with an area of 11,700 km^{2} (4,500 sq mi). Including the estuary and the River Feale, the total catchment drains a total of 16,865 km^{2} (6,512 sq mi).

It has a Long Term Average Flow of 208.1 m^{3}/s (7,350 cu ft/s) (at Limerick City). This is double the flow rate of Ireland's second largest river, the River Corrib (104.8 m^{3}/s [3,700 cu ft/s]). If the discharges from all of the rivers and streams into the Shannon Estuary (including the rivers Feale 34.6 m^{3}/s, Maigue 15.6 m^{3}/s, Fergus 25.7 m^{3}/s, and Deel 7.4 m^{3}/s) are added to the discharge at Limerick, the total discharge of the River Shannon at its mouth at Loop Head reaches 300 m^{3}/s (11,000 cu ft/s).

The River Shannon is a traditional freshwater river for just 45% of its total length. Excluding the 63.5-mile (102.2 km) tidal estuary from its total length of 224 miles (360 km), if one also excludes the lakes (L. Derg 24 mi, L. Ree 18 mi, L. Allen 7 mi plus L. Boderg, L. Bofin, L. Forbes, L. Corry) from the Shannon's freshwater flow of 160.5 miles (258.3 km), the Shannon as a freshwater river is only about 100 miles (160 km) long.

The Shannon River Basin is part of the Shannon International River Basin District (SHIRBD) administrative area which has an area of 17,963 km^{2} (6,936 sq mi) in area. In addition to the Shannon Basin, the district also covers coastal parts of counties Kerry and Clare which drain to the sea. The SHIRBD contains 7,666 km (4,763 mi) of rivers, 1,220 km (760 mi) of coastline including estuaries, and 113 lakes, including 53 over 50 hectares (120 acres) in size. The main land use throughout the SHIRBD area is agriculture (70.7%). Peatlands (11.1%) and forestry (3.2%) are also important. The SHIRBD's population is 618,884 at 34 inhabitants per square kilometre (88/sq mi) (Census data 2002).

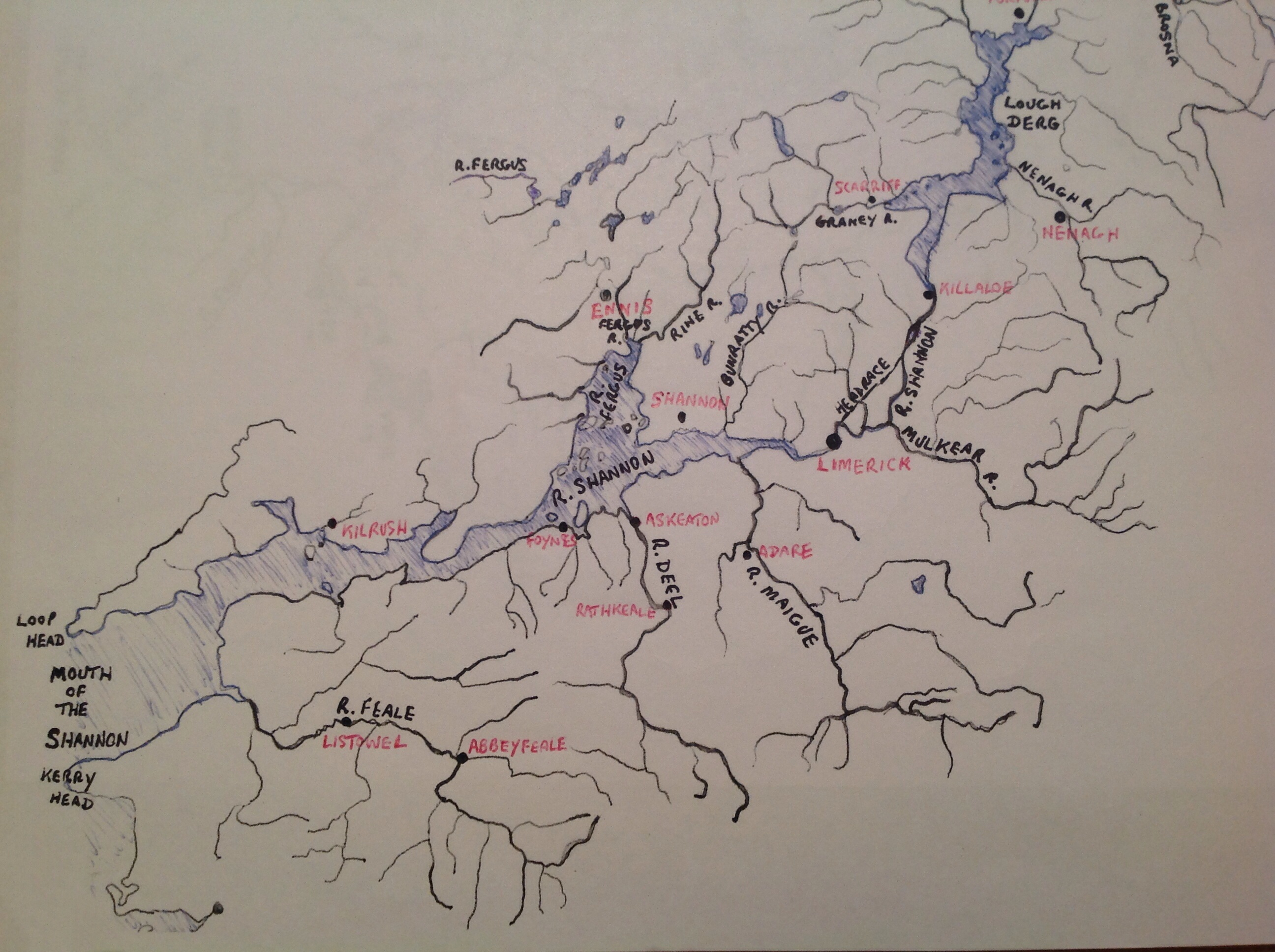
Lower Shannon Basin including the Shannon Estuary

== Furthest sources ==
There are some tributaries within the River Shannon system which have headwaters that are further in length (from source to mouth) than the Shannon Pot source, such as the Owenmore River (County Cavan) in County Cavan, which flows west for 14.5 km (9.0 mi) through the valley of Glangevlin before joining the Shannon about 3 km (2 mi) below the Shannon Pot at Lugnashinna, thus adding 11 km (7 mi) to the Shannon's overall length, bringing it to 372 km (231 mi).

Upper Shannon catchment (with Shannon source, Owenmore River (County Cavan) and Boyle River Basin)

Also the Boyle River has a similar claim. The river flow from the furthest reaches of the Boyle catchment to Limerick city has a measurement of 290 km (180 mi). When added to the Shannon's 102.2 km (63.5 miles) estuary this gives a total river flow of 392.1 km (243.6 mi), which makes it the longest river within the River Shannon basin (from source to mouth)—31.6 km (19.6 mi) longer than the Shannon Pot source. Thus the Boyle-Shannon river can be regarded as having the longest natural river flow in Ireland.

== Geography ==
The River Shannon Basin touches more than half (17) of Ireland's counties:- Limerick, Clare, Tipperary, Offaly, Westmeath, Longford, Roscommon, Kerry, Galway, Leitrim, Cavan, Sligo, Mayo, Cork, Laois, Meath and Fermanagh.

=== Towns situated in the Shannon Basin ===
Towns and Villages (with 2011 populations) within the Shannon River Basin and the rivers and riverbanks on which they stand:

Shannon River: (going downstream)

- Dowra
- Drumshanbo (Lough Allen Canal – Left Bank) 857
- Leitrim Village (L. Bank) 485
- Carrick-on-Shannon 3,980
- Jamestown (L. Bank)
- Drumsna (L. Bank) 247
- Drumod (Lough Boderg – L. Bank) 356
- Roosky (Right Bank) 188
- Newtown Forbes (Lough Forbes – L. Bank) 759
- Termonbarry (R. Bank) 366
- Cloondara (L. Bank)
- Lanesborough 1,388
- Athlone 20,153
- Clonmacnoise (L. Bank)
- Shannonbridge (L. Bank) 206
- Banagher (L. Bank) 1,653
- Portumna (R. Bank) 1,530
- Terryglass (Lough Derg – L. Bank)
- Mountshannon (Lough Derg – R. Bank) 152
- Dromineer (Lough Derg – L. Bank) 113
- Ballina (L. Bank) 2,442
- Killaloe (R. Bank) 1,292
- O'Briensbridge 235
- Castleconnell (L. Bank) 1,917
- Ardnacrusha
- Limerick City 87,081
- Shannon (S. Estuary – R. Bank) 9,673
- Kilrush (S. Estuary – R. Bank) 2,695
- Carrigaholt (S. Estuary – R. Bank)
- Foynes (S. Estuary – L. Bank) 543
- Glin (S. Estuary – L. Bank) 577
- Tarbert (S. Estuary – L. Bank) 551
- Ballylongford (S. Estuary – L. Bank) 418
- Ballybunion (S. Estuary – L. Bank) 1,354

=== Shannon River tributaries ===
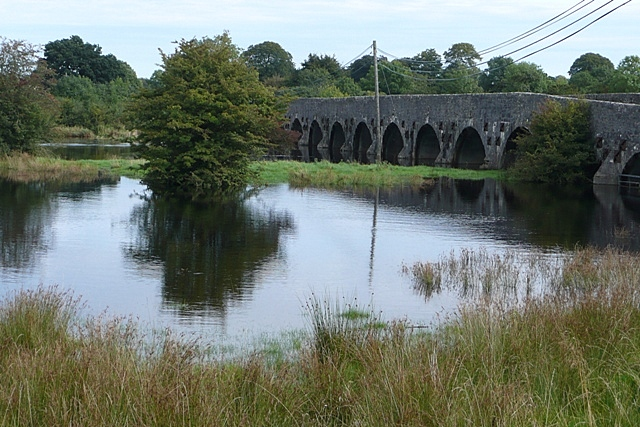
River Suck at Ballyforan Bridge

- Boyle river: Boyle 2,588
- Lung river: Ballaghaderreen (outskirts) 1,822
- Camlin river: Longford 9,601
- Hind river: Roscommon (outskirts) 5,693
- River Inny (Leinster): Mullingar 20,103
- River Brosna: Ballymahon 1,563, Ferbane 1,165, Tullamore (Tullamore river) 14,361
- River Suck: Castlerea 1,985, Athleague 241, Ballinasloe 6,577
- Little Brosna river: Birr 5,452
- Ballyfinboy River: Borrisokane 1,145, Cloughjordan 511
- Nenagh river: Nenagh 8,439
- River Graney: Scariff 798
- Ratty river, also named Owengarney River or O'Garney River,: Sixmilebridge 1,839, Bunratty 219
- River Fergus: Ennis 25,360, Newmarket-on-Fergus 1,773
- River Maigue: Adare 1,106
- River Deel: Rathkeale 1,550, Askeaton 1,149
- River Feale: Listowel 4,338, Abbeyfeale 2,007

== Tributary Sub Catchments ==
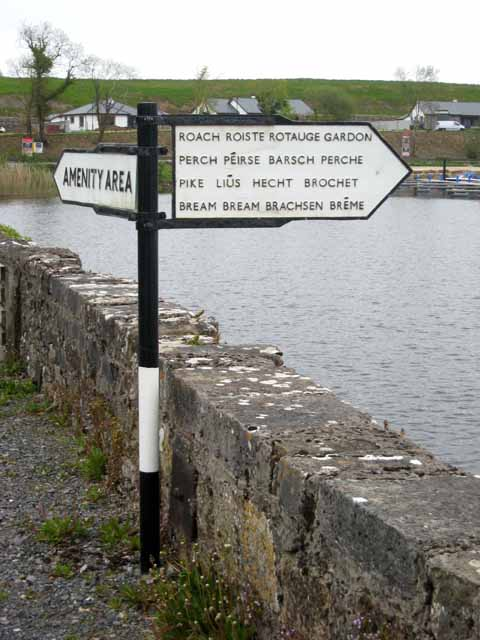
River Boyle at Coothall

Freshwater Catchments (With Areas – km^{2}) Going downstream

Left Bank:

- L Allen (upstream from L. Allen outlet) 415 km^{2}
- Eslin River 73 km^{2}
- River Rinn 311 km^{2}
- Camlin River 352 km^{2}
- River Inny (Leinster) 1,254 km^{2}
- River Brosna 1,248 km^{2}
- Little Brosna River 662 km^{2}
- Ballyfinboy River 182 km^{2}
- Nenagh River 321 km^{2}
- Mulkear River 660 km^{2}

Right Bank:

- Boyle River 725 km^{2}
- Hind River 78 km^{2}
- River Suck 1,600 km^{2}
- Cappagh/Kilcrow 414 km^{2}
- River Graney 295 km^{2}

Estuarine Catchments Areas

Left Bank:

- River Maigue 1,000^{2}
- River Deel 426 km^{2}
- River Feale 1,170 km^{2}

Right Bank:

- Bunratty River 233 km^{2}
- River Fergus 1,043 km^{2}

There are many other smaller tributaries which join the Shannon along its journey.

== Lakes ==
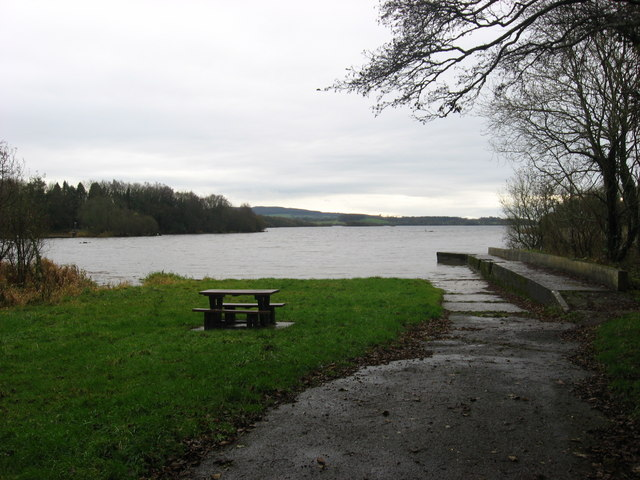
Lough Sheelin, County Cavan

There are a multitude of lakes within the Shannon River Basin, both on the main river and throughout the sub-catchments.

Here is a table showing the major lakes:

Lake	Area	Basin
Lough Derg	130 km^{2}	Shannon
Lough Ree	105 km^{2}	Shannon
Lough Allen	35 km^{2}	Shannon
Lough Sheelin	19 km^{2}	Inny
Lough Ennell	14.34 km^{2}	Brosna
Lough Gara	11.9 km^{2}	Boyle
Lough Derravaragh	10.8 km^{2}	Inny
Lough Owel	10.3 km^{2}	Brosna
Lough Bofin/Boderg/Scannal	9.7 km^{2}	Shannon
Lough Key	8.4 km^{2}	Boyle
Lough Graney	3.7 km^{2}	Graney
Lough Forbes	3 km^{2}	Shannon
Lough Eidin (Drumharlow Lough)	2.7 km^{2}	Boyle
Lough Funshinagh	2.5 km^{2}	Shannon

== See also ==
- River Shannon
- Shannon Callows
- Rivers of Ireland
- List of rivers of Ireland
- List of loughs of Ireland
