= Killukin =

Civil parish in County Roscommon, Ireland

Coordinates: 53°56′0″N 8°06′30″W

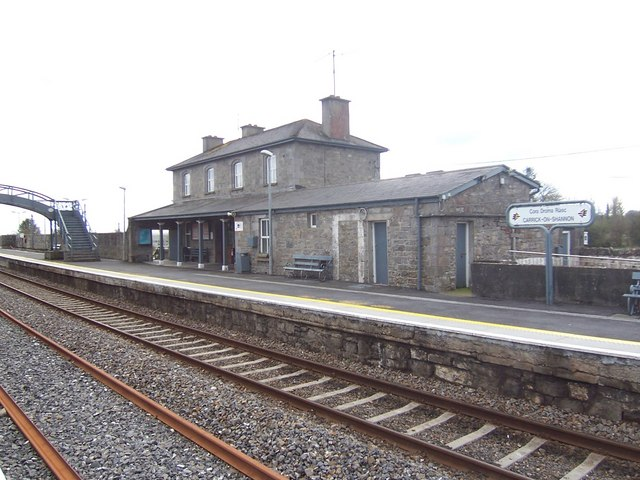
Carrick-on-Shannon railway station is in Cortober townland within Killukin civil parish

Killukin (Irish: Cill Abhaicín), sometimes known as Killucan, is a civil parish in the barony of Boyle, County Roscommon in Ireland. It overlaps with parts of the town of Carrick-on-Shannon, to which it is connected via a bridge over the River Shannon. Much of the parish is located along the road from Carrick-on-Shannon to Elphin. It is bounded on the north by the parish of Toomna, on the west by the parishes of Eastersnow and Ardcarne, on the south by the parish of Killummond, and on the east by the River Shannon.

== Name ==
Killukin, which derives from Cill-ibhicin in Irish and is pronounced Kill-Evickeen, relates to a church (or cill) and a saint or person associated with that church. The saint seems to be the person whom the catalogue of the churches of the Diocese of Elphin calls Lunecharia and asserts to be venerated on 7 June in a certain chapel of the same diocese called Kill Lunechair which lies near the Episcopal See.

The place possibly began as a hermitage in times soon after Saint Patrick. Local tradition claims that there was a monastic settlement in the field between Cordrehid Road and the graveyard road and a round tower.

== Townlands ==
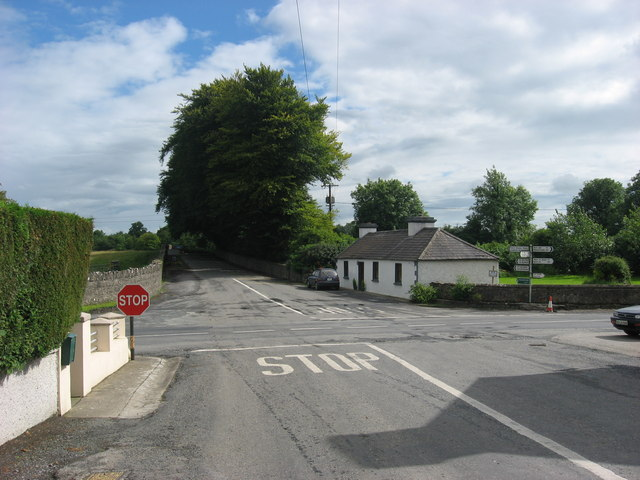
Crossroads in Croghan townland

The civil parish of Killukin contains approximately 27 townlands. These include smaller townlands, like Glebe and Knockadalteen (approximately 20 acres (0.08 km^{2}) and 105 acres (0.4 km^{2}) in area respectively), to larger townlands like Croghan (430 acres (2 km^{2})).
