= Thomas Finan =

Thomas Finan may refer to:

- Thomas J. Finan, American medieval historian and archaeologist
- Thomas B. Finan, American politician and judge from Maryland
