= William Digby (Archdeacon of Elphin) =

William Digby was an Irish Anglican priest.

Digby was born in King's County (now Offaly) and educated at Trinity College, Dublin. He held livings at Killashee and Killukin. He was Archdeacon of Elphin from 1809 until 1823.
