= R285 road (Ireland) =

Road in Ireland

R285 road
- Bóthar R285
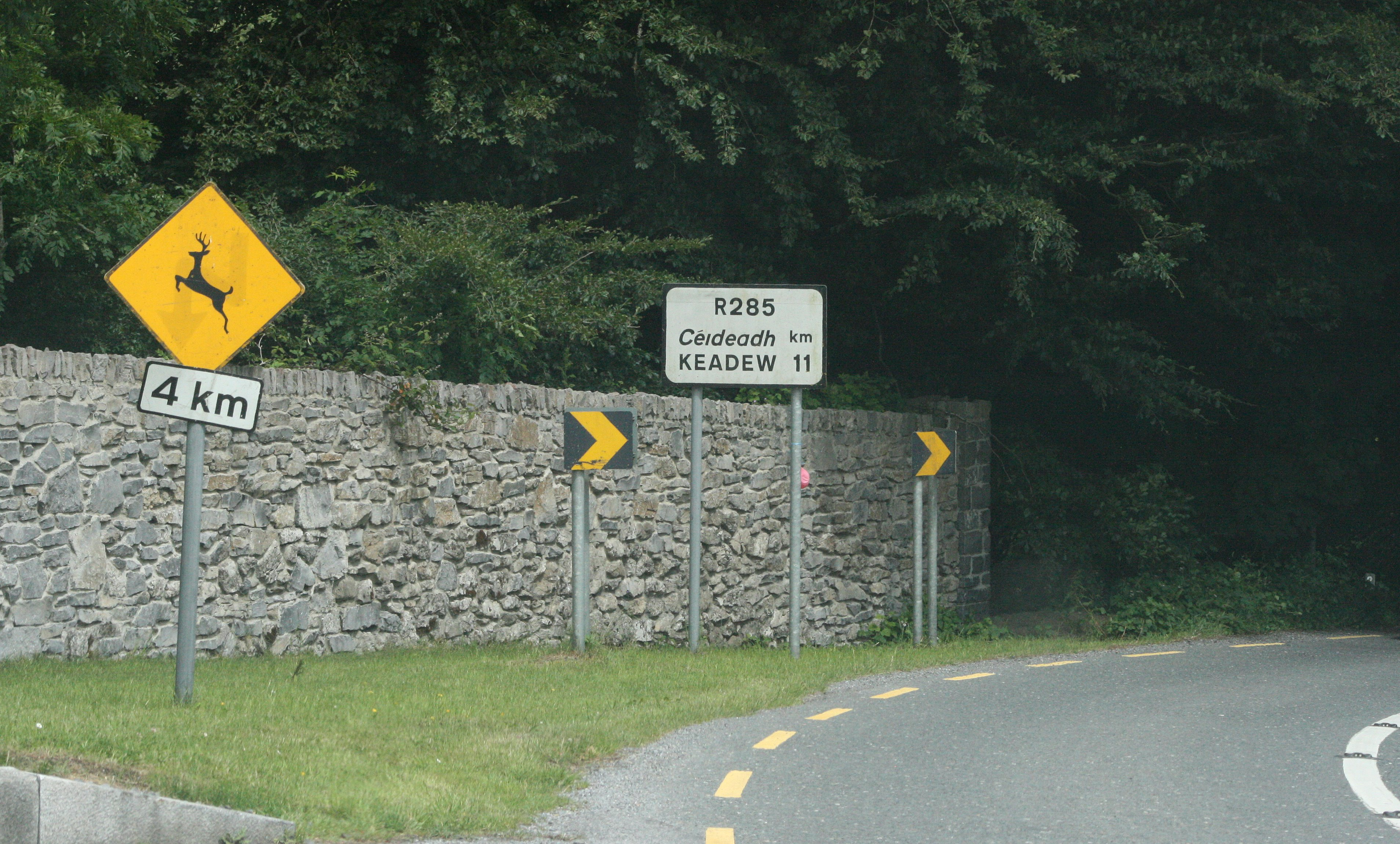
- R285 road, on leaving the N4

Route information
- Length: 16 km (9.9 mi)

Location
- Country: Ireland
- Primary destinations: County Roscommon; N4 – Starts 5 km east of Boyle; Knockvicar – (R290); Crosses the Boyle River; Keadue – joins/leaves R284; Mountallen – terminates at the R280

Highway system
- Roads in Ireland; Motorways; Primary; Secondary; Regional

The R285 road is a regional road in Ireland linking the N4 at a point east of Boyle, County Roscommon to the R280 at Mountallen. The road lies entirely within County Roscommon.

En route it passes through Knockvicar and Keadue. The road is 16 km (9.9 mi) long.

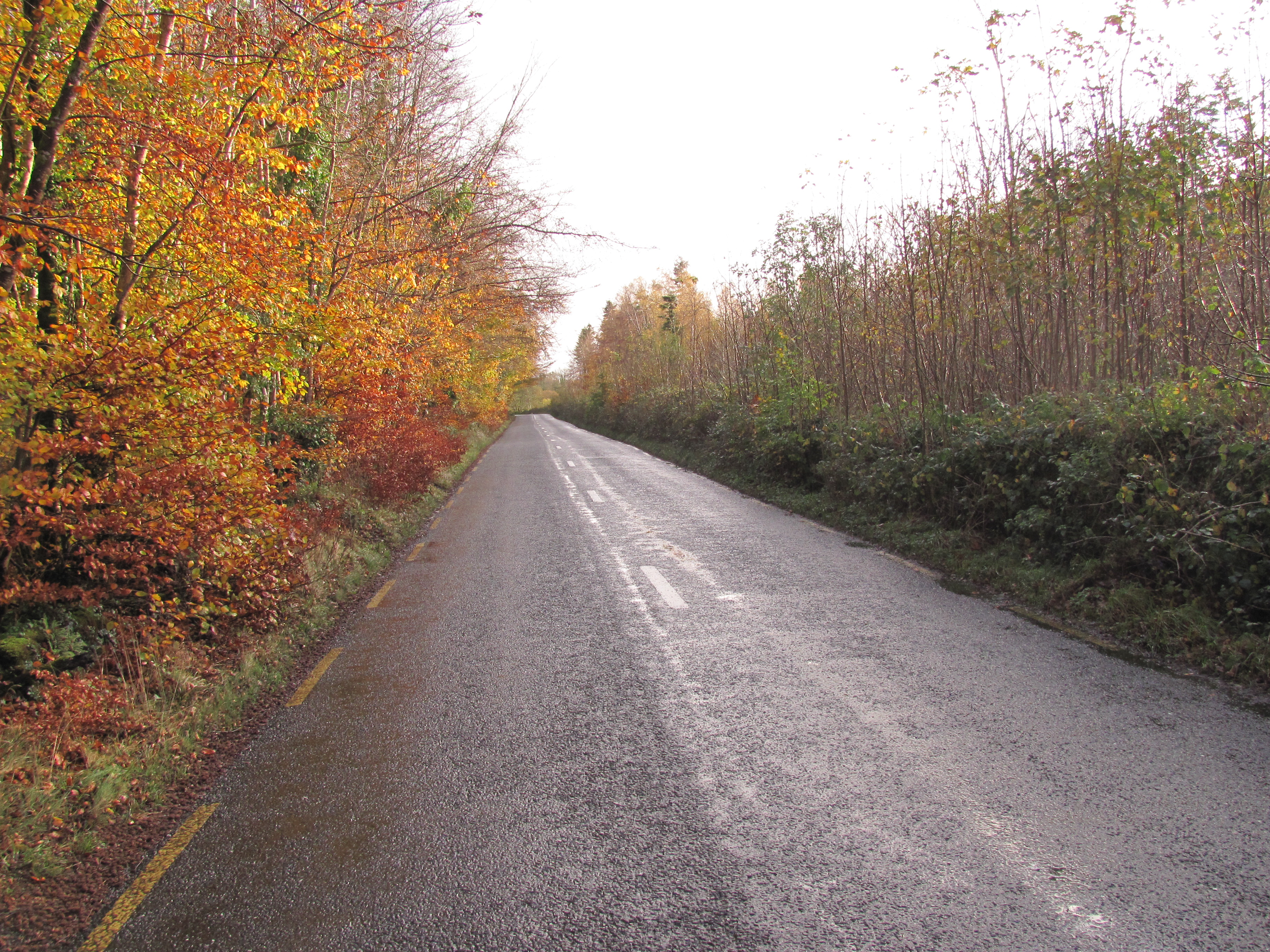
Autumn leaves near Keadew

== See also ==
- Roads in Ireland
- National primary road
- National secondary road
