= Errit Lough =

Lake in County Roscommon, Ireland

- Loch Eirid (Irish)
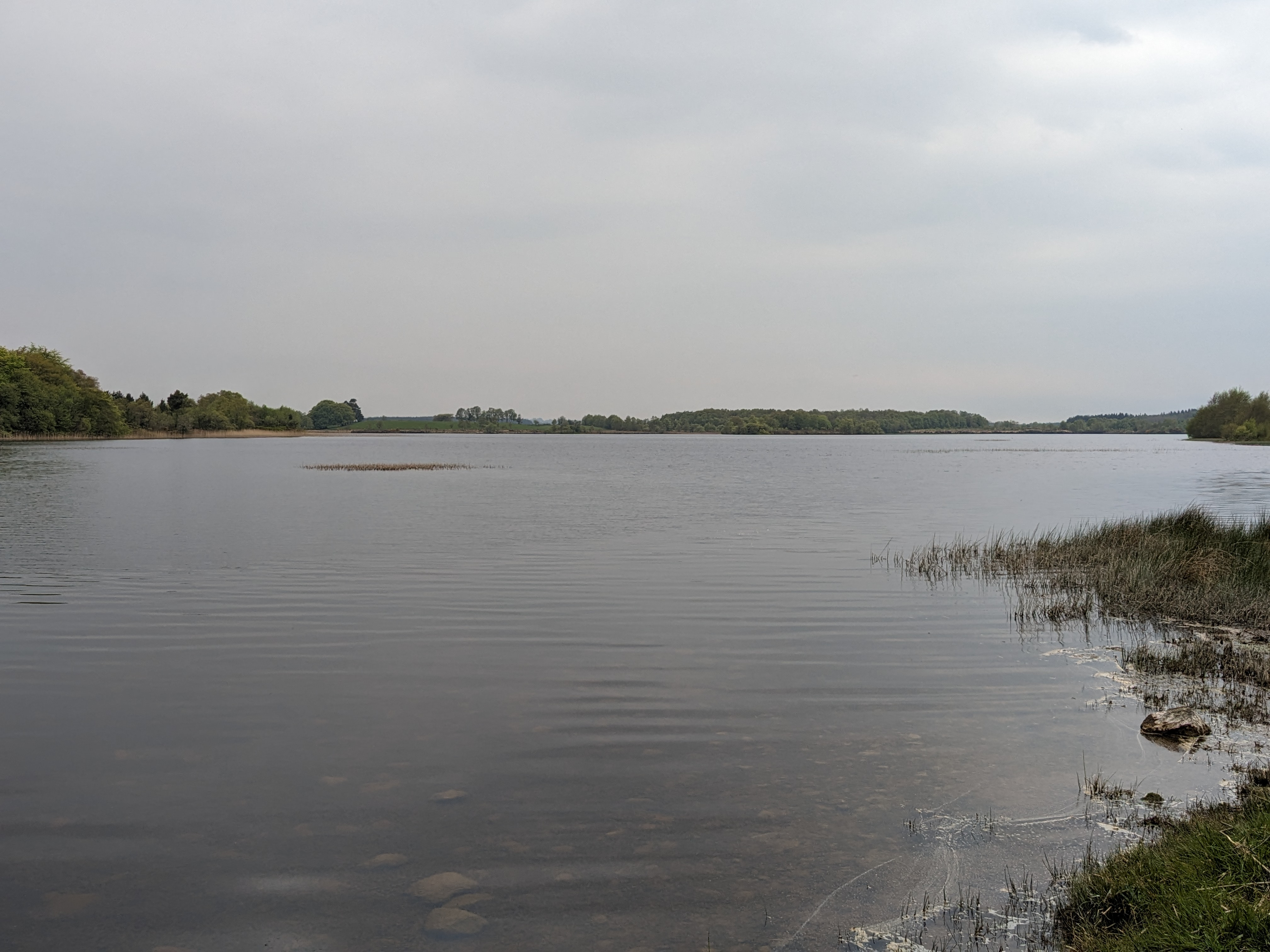

- Location in Ireland
- Location: County Roscommon
- Coordinates: 53°48′48″N 8°42′12″W
- Primary outflows: River Lung
- Catchment area: 7.15 km^{2} (2.8 sq mi)
- Basin countries: Ireland
- Max. length: 1.25 km (0.8 mi)
- Max. width: 0.7 km (0.4 mi)
- Surface area: 0.82 km^{2} (0.32 sq mi)
- Surface elevation: 83 m (272 ft)

Errit Lough (Irish: Loch Eirid) is a freshwater lake in the west of Ireland. It is located in west County Roscommon in the catchment of the Boyle River. The lake is a Natura 2000 site. It is protected as a Special Area of Conservation (or SAC) since May 2016 under the qualification of a specific habitat type: the presence of ‘Hard Water Lakes’, alternatively known as ‘Hard oligo-mesotrophic waters with benthic vegetation of Chara spp.’

== Location ==
Errit Lough is located approximately 10 km south-west of the town of Ballaghaderreen in County Roscommon. The lake is situated in the upper part of the Boyle River catchment. The area of Errit Lough included in the SAC designation is located in the townlands of Cloondart, Derreenamackaun, Errit, Gortaganny (Electoral District Artagh South) and Tully (Electoral District Artagh South) in County Roscommon. Schedule 1 of the Statutory Instrument for this site identifies it as encompassing an area of 84.59 ha.

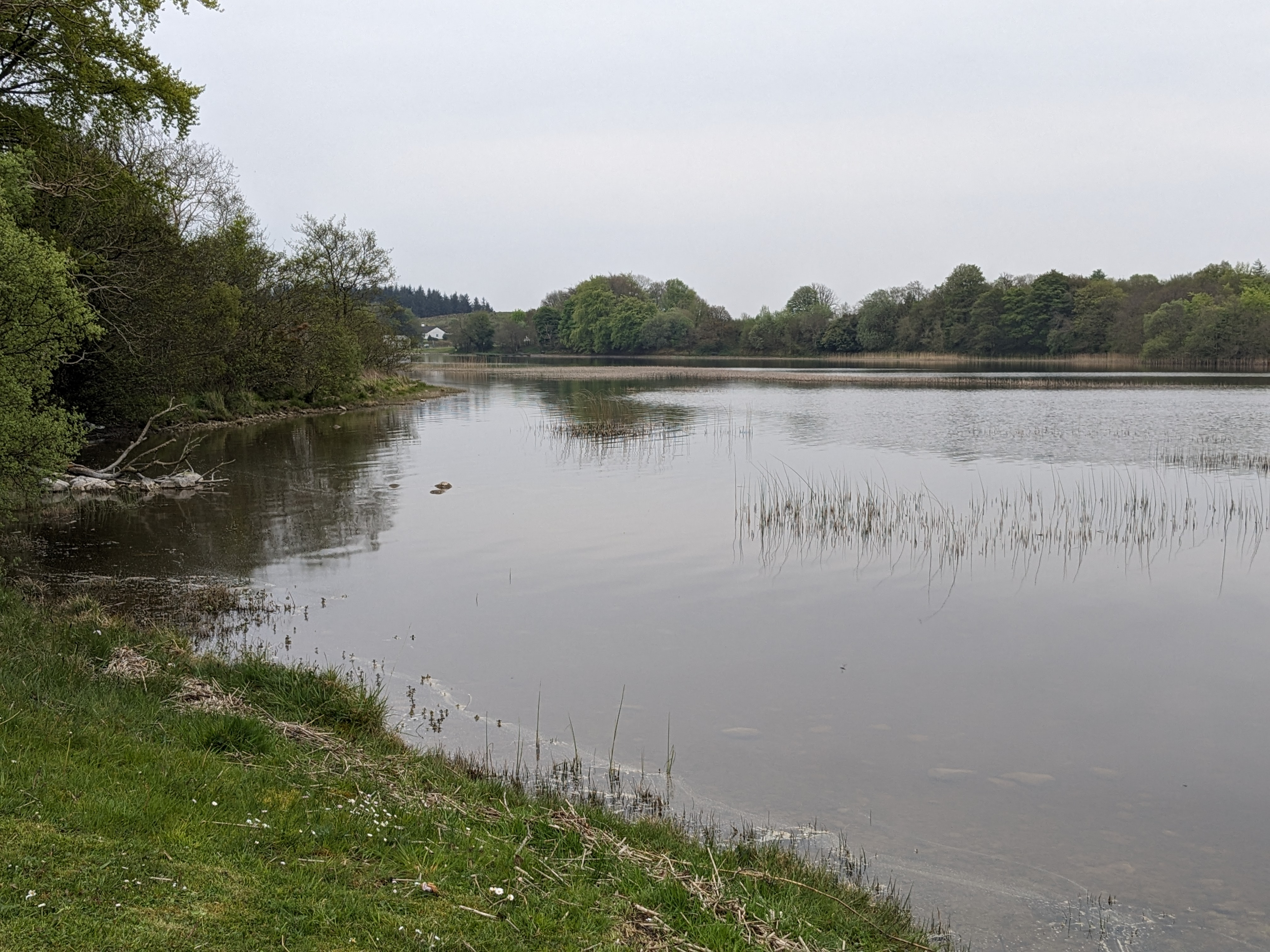
Errit Lough and surroundings form a Special Area of Conservation

== SAC qualification ==
The Errit Lough site was proposed as a Site of Community Importance (SCI) in 1998. In 2016, the site was designated as a Special Area of Conservation, with site code IE0000607. Statutory Instrument 266 of 2016 established the site as an SAC. The feature which qualifies this site for SAC status is the presence of Hard Water Lakes – this habitat is also known as ‘‘Hard oligo-mesotrophic waters with benthic vegetation of Chara spp.’. Under the EU Habitats Directive, this is an Annex I habitat type (code 3140). The Interpretation Manual of European Union Habitats defines this habitat as comprising:

“Lakes and pools with waters fairly rich in dissolved bases (pH often 6-7) (Pal. 22.12) or with mostly blue to greenish, very clear, waters poor (to moderate) in nutrients, base-rich (pH often >7.5) (Pal. 22.15). The bottom of these unpolluted water bodies are covered with charophyte, Chara and Nitella, algal carpets. In the Boreal region this habitat type includes small calcareous-rich oligo-mesotrophic gyttja pools with dense Chara (dominating species is Chara strigosa) carpets, often surrounded by various eutrophic fens and pine bogs.”

Hard water lakes are typically base-rich, oligotrophic and unpolluted, with clear water. The NPWS publication "Benthic vegetation in Irish marl lakes: monitoring habitat 3140 condition 2011 to 2018" notes that the alkalinity of this lake was 136 mg/l CaCO^{3} and the euphotic depth (a measure of water clarity: the depth at which photosynthetic available radiation is 1% of its surface value) was 3.3 m. Typically lakes with total phosphorus of less than 0.01 mg/l have euphotic depth of over 5.0 m, but Lough Errit, a high-colour lake (of over 45 Hazen units), has low levels of phosphorus (total phosphorus of approximately 0.01 mg/l) and a low euphotic depth. This document notes four Charophyte species occurring in this lake, with charophyte cover of 0.52 (52%). It is noted that in Ireland, marl lakes and cut-over bogs often occur in the same location, an issue for this habitat type is the leaching of coloured water into these lakes, resulting in a high water colour. This may explain the low levels of deeper water vegetation in Errit Lough.

=== Vegetation ===
The east side of this marl lake has exposed stony shores. On the west side of the lake are more sheltered areas. Within these more protected bays can be found emergent species such as Common Club-rush (Scirpus lacustris or Schoenoplectus lacustris) and Common Reed (Phragmites australis). Bottle Sedge (Carex rostrata) and Common Spike-rush (Eleocharis palustris) also occur on the west side of the site.

As part of the designation criteria for the site (Hard Water lake with Chara Spp), there are beds of stonewort species (Chara spp) growing on the lake bed. These species include Chara pedunculata, C. rudis, C. desmacantha and C. fragilis. In certain areas of the lake, floating Yellow water-lily (Nuphar lutea) are recorded.

=== Nearby Special Areas of Conservation and proposed Natural Heritage Areas ===
As can be seen from the National Parks and Wildlife Service (NPWS) designated sites map, other designated SAC sites nearby include Urlaur Lough (NPWS site code 001571), Derrinea bog (NPWS site code 000604), Carrowbehy/Caher Bog (NPWS site code 000597), Drumalough Bog (NPWS site code 002338), and the River Moy SAC (NPWS site code 002298). This concentration of designated SACs in the area indicates that this location is ecologically very valuable. The Errit Lough site has been included as a proposed Natural Heritage Area (or pNHA) by the National Parks and Wildlife Service (NPWS). Other nearby pNHA sites include Urlaur Lough, Carrowbehy/Caher Bog, Derrinea Bog, Mannin And Island Lakes, Drumalough Bog and Lough Glinn.

== Other features ==
=== Geology ===
The area surrounding the lake is a County Geological Site (or CGS). This area comprises the Erris and Cloonagh Loughs Deltas (site code RO012). The deltas are wide, flat-topped ridges of gravel and sand, situated above the nearby bog area. The deltas are considered to be good examples of deglacial, ice-marginal, meltwater-deposited features which frequently form at the edge of glacial lakes. The deltas were deposited at this site during deglaciation after the last Ice Age, at the edge of the northwestward-retreating ice sheet and date from the Quaternary period. These deltas were formed on Lower Carboniferous limestone bedrock and are made up of limestone clasts, which came from the bedrock around the site. The ice carried them until they were released into a meltwater conduit within the ice. They were then deposited at the margin of the ice sub-aqueously at the point where the river left the ice, flowing in a southeastward direction.

=== Archaeology ===
The Historic Environment Viewer map of Irish recorded monuments includes a number of historic features at Errit Lough. A number of crannógs have been recorded from the lake (site codes RO019-004, RO019-005, RO109-009 and RO019-011). From the recorded monuments records, site code RO019-010 refers to a well (with no evidence that it is a holy well) known as Tober Skeheen, which has a pump-house. Site RO019-006 refers to a circular embanked enclosure with external diameter of approximately 35 metres, which was noted on the 1837 Irish Ordnance Survey maps. It is suggested from these records that this may have been a rath. Site RO019-008 refers to a souterrain sited on the crest of a low north-south ridge south-west of the lake. The precise location is unknown and the information about it comes from local knowledge. Site RO019-012 to the east of the lake refers to a children’s burial ground.

=== Walking trails ===
There is a walking trail around Errit Lough, which is part of the Lough Errit Walking Trail, which includes a range of looped walks of between 4 and 11 km in length. Dogs on leads are allowed but the walks are not buggy-accessible.

== Conservation objectives ==
The primary conservation objective for the site is to “maintain the favourable conservation condition of Hard oligo-mesotrophic waters with benthic vegetation of Chara spp. in Errit Lough SAC”. This includes objectives to maintain the habitat area /extent subject to natural processes, to prevent decline of the habitat distribution, to prevent decline of the lake vegetation composition, zonation and depth, and to maintain the hydrological regime (groundwater flows) in order to support the habitat. The water quality should be maintained with low (oligotrophic) nutrient concentrations, high transparency, high chlorophyll, phytoplankton and algal biomass status.

== See also ==
- List of loughs in Ireland
- List of Special Areas of Conservation in the Republic of Ireland
