= Thomas J. Finan =

Thomas J. Finan, (born 1967), is an American medieval historian and archaeologist, and presently the Director of the Walter J. Ong, S.J. Center for Digital Humanities at Saint Louis University in St. Louis, Missouri. He is formerly the Chair of the Department of History, associate director of the Center for Medieval and Renaissance Studies, and the Director of the Center for International Studies at Saint Louis University. Finan is a specialist in the history and archaeology of medieval Ireland, and has appeared in a number of popular formats as well as an Emmy-nominated documentary, True Gaelic, concerning his archaeological excavations at the moated site near Lough Key, County Roscommon, Ireland, in 2016. He has appeared in local and international media spots. He is a licensed archaeologist in the Republic of Ireland, and is a Registered Professional Archaeologist in the United States. He is a member of the Royal Society of Antiquaries of Ireland. He was elected a Fellow of the Society of Antiquaries of London in 2012. In 2019, he was elected to the Comite Permanente de Chateau Gaillard: International Castle Studies Colloque, representing Ireland.

== Biography ==
Finan was born in St. Louis, MO, and graduated from Saint Louis University High School in 1985. Finan received his BA in Religious Studies and Anthropology with Honors from the University of Missouri-Columbia in 1989. He received his AM from the Divinity School of the University of Chicago, where he studied medieval church history under Bernard McGinn. He completed a PhD in history from the Catholic University of America in 2001 under Professor Lawrence Poos, focussing on the history and archaeology of thirteenth century Ireland.

Finan is an active field archaeologist, with experience in local St. Louis archaeology, medieval Wales, and medieval Ireland. As a student he excavated at Cosmeston Medieval Village near Penarth, Wales, and the early Christian hermitage at Illanloughan, County Kerry, Ireland. He has directed several research excavations in north County Roscommon, including the medieval church complex at Kilteasheen, near Knockvicar, Roscommon, the Rockingham moated site near Lough Key, and most recently the Rock of Lough Key.

He is a founding member of the American Society of Irish Medieval Studies.

== Recognition ==
- Fellow of the Society of Antiquaries of London
- Member of the Royal Society of Antiquaries of Ireland
- Comite Permanente, Chateau Gaillard Castle Studies Colloque (2018- )
- Fulbright Specialist--Ireland (2026)
- NGA Geospatial Pilot Award (2026)
- Royal Irish Academy Awards (2006, 2008, 2009, 2022, 2023)

== Writing ==
His research focuses on the interdisciplinary connections between such disparate fields as history, archaeology, and literature, and how these disciplines together can gain a better understanding of the past.

=== Books ===
- Landscape and History on the Irish Frontier: The Kings Cantreds in the Thirteenth Century (Turnhout, Brepols, 2016)
- Archaeology, People, and Landscapes: Essays in Honor of Jenna Higgins (Rockingham, Institute of European Archaeology Press, 2012)
- Medieval Lough Cé: History, Archaeology, Landscape (Dublin, Four Courts Press, 2010)
- A Nation in Medieval Ireland? Perspectives on Gaelic National Identity, 1200-1400 (Oxford, Archaeopress: 2004)

=== Select scholarly articles ===
- "Medieval Moated Sites in County Roscommon, Ireland: A Statistical Approach," Chateau Gaillard: Etudes de Castellogie Medievale, Aarhus (University of Caan, Volume 26, 2014)
- "The medieval bishops of Elphin and the lost church at Kilteasheen," in Princes, Prelates, and Poets in Medieval Ireland: Essays in Honour of Katharine Simms (Four Courts Press, Dublin, 2013)
- "Castle Reconstruction using 3D Computer Technology," Chateau Gaillard: Etudes de Catellogie Medievale, Rindern (University of Caan, Volume 25, 2012)
- "Bioarchaeology of a medieval Irish ecclesiastical settlement," American Journal of Physical Anthropology (Spring, Volume 52, 2011), 135
- "Violence in Thirteenth Century Ireland," Eolas: The Journal of the American Society of Irish Medieval Studies (Volume 4, 2010), 86-97
- "O'Conor Grand Strategy and the Connacht Chronicle in the Thirteenth Century," in Medieval Lough Cé: History, Archaeology, Landscape (Four Courts Press, Dublin, 2010)
