= Boyle (barony) =

Barony (land unit) in County Roscommon, Ireland

Boyle Mainistir na Búille (Irish)
- Barony
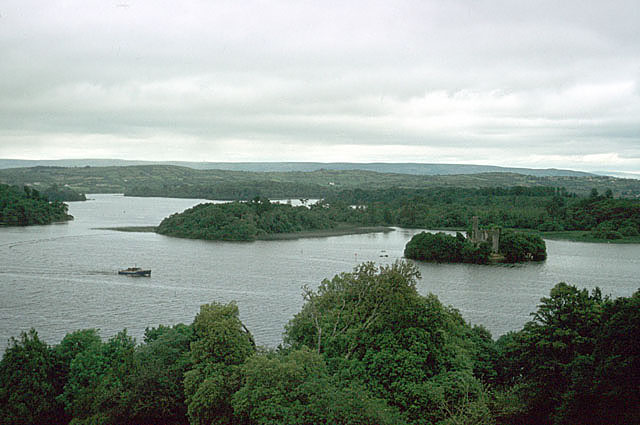
- View of Lough Key

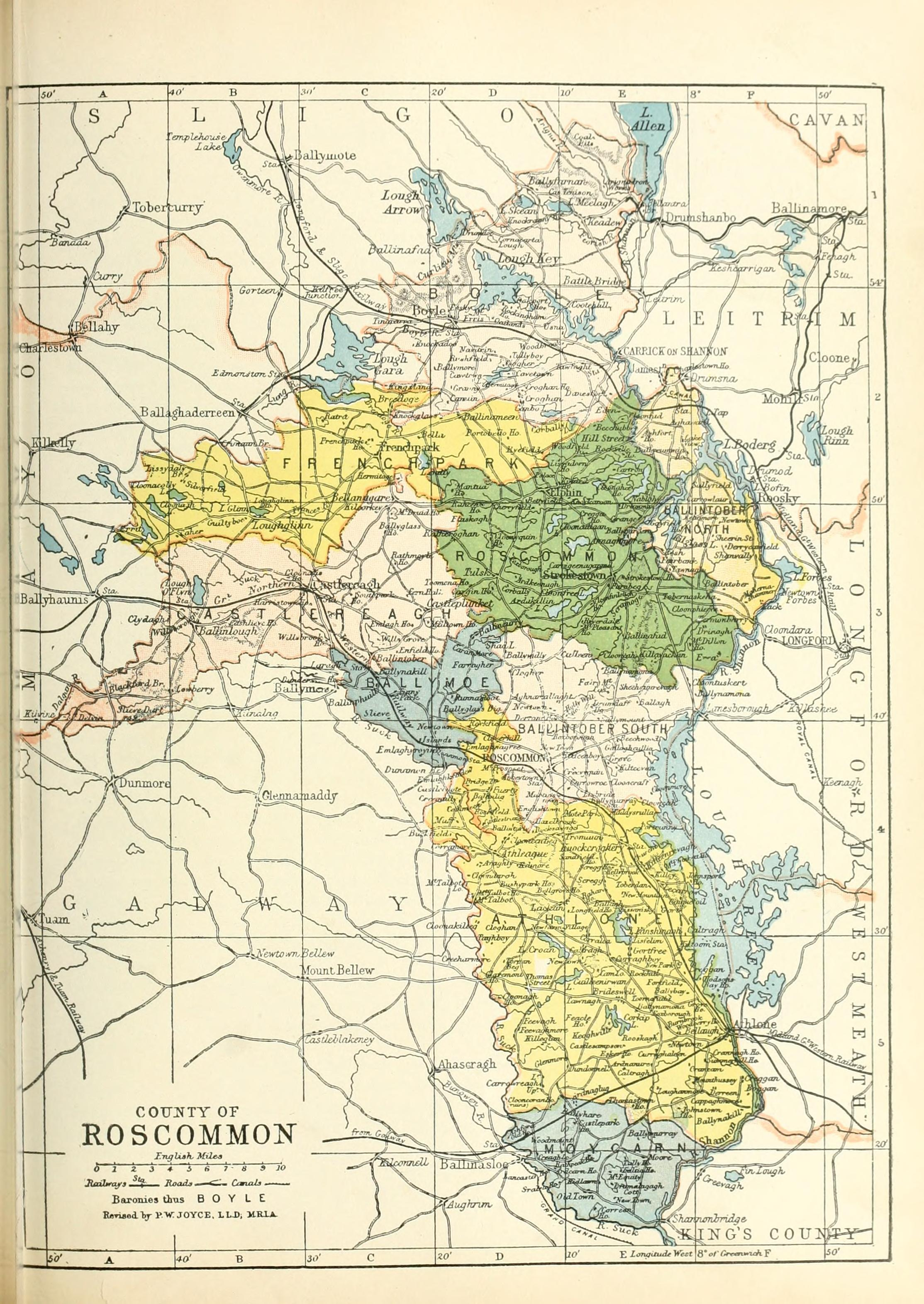
- Barony map of County Roscommon, 1900; Boyle is coloured pink, in the north.
- Sovereign state: Ireland
- Province: Connacht
- County: Roscommon

Area
  - Total: 328.46 km^{2} (126.82 sq mi)

Boyle (Irish: Mainistir na Búille) is a barony in the far north of County Roscommon in Ireland.

== Etymology ==
Boyle barony is named after Boyle town, itself named after Boyle Abbey, which is named after the Boyle River.

== Geography ==
Boyle barony is located in the far north of County Roscommon, separated from County Sligo by Lough Gara, the Curlew Mountains and Lough Arrow, and separated from County Leitrim by Lough Allen and the River Shannon. It contains Lough Key.

== History ==
Boyle barony loosely corresponds to the ancient Gaelic kingdom of Magh Luirg an Dagda (Moylurg), the "plain of the tracks of Dagda."

In the 1585 Composition of Connacht, Boyle barony was confirmed as the possession of the Mac Diarmada, except for those parts which belonged to the Queen (then Elizabeth I) or the Church of Ireland.

== List of settlements ==
Below is a list of settlements in Boyle barony:

- Arigna
- Ballyfarnon
- Boyle
- Cortober
- Cootehall
- Croghan
- Keadue
- Knockvicar
