= Ardcarn Mound =

Mound and ringfort in Ireland

- Ard Carna (Irish)
- Location within Ireland
- 53.962165°N 8.206852°W
- Type: ringfort
- Location: Ardcarne, County Roscommon, Ireland

History
- Built: Neolithic/Bronze Age (4000 – 800 BC)

Site notes
- Elevation: 86 m (282 ft)

National monument of Ireland
- Official name: Ardcarn Mound
- Reference no.: 488

Ardcarn Mound is a mound and ringfort and National Monument located in County Roscommon, Ireland.

== Location ==
Ardcarn Mound is located about 6 km (3.7 mi) east of Boyle and 3 km (1.9 mi) south of Lough Key.

== History and description ==
Ardcarn Mound is a bowl barrow. Immediately to the west of this is a trivallate ringfort with souterrain, and to the south of that is a simple rath.
