= Callows =

Type of wetland found in Ireland

Callows (Irish: caladh) are a type of wetland found in Ireland. They are a seasonally flooded grassland ecosystem found on low-lying river floodplains.

The callows are located at the center of Ireland. 5856 hectares of the callows are protected as a Special Area of Conservation (SAC). At the heart of the callows is the River Shannon: one of the only unregulated rivers left in western Europe. The River Shannon extends 360 kilometers. More than 20% of Ireland's landmass is drained by the River Shannon. Unlike many other parts of the world, the callows is relatively untouched by mankind. The area has not fallen victim to intensive agriculture or development by humans, making it a refuge for a wide range of flora and fauna.

The callows are a wetland ecosystem full of rivers and creeks. Rolling hills and grassy meadows, which are full of cows, horses, flowers, birds, and more, extended for great distances in every direction. There are very few trees and tall plants as the grazers keep the plant life trimmed down. The region is also an ecotone that forms a gradient of dry to wet space controlled by flooding. Additionally the wetland area is mainly flat, which creates a flat river gradient and slows the movement of water.

There are a few main characteristics that control the biodiversity of riparian ecosystems: hydrology, productivity, disturbance, and the heterogeneity of space. Fluctuations in water levels regulate plant distributions, species diversity, and the composition of the callows community. Factors, such as time, depth, and frequency, greatly affect the functioning of the ecosystem. The wetlands and meadows are home to a variety of organisms. The unique and well preserved habitat promotes a number of biological services. For example, spanning the vast meadows in this region are a range of insect-pollinated plant species. Thus, pollination services are provided and the diversity of life in the callows will prevail.

Even though the area is mainly free of human interaction, there are still some aspects of the callows that are regulated by people. First, since floodplains typically support hay meadows, there are farmers that still cut hay annually. This process has gone on for hundreds of years and actually promotes diversity of flora. There have also been a number of failed attempts to control the magnitude and duration of flooding in the wetland area.

As with most places on Earth, climate change driven by humans is altering the callows ecosystem. Many aspects of seasonal flooding will begin to change with the drier summers and wetter winters that predicted in the future. Wetter winters mean longer flooding time and potentially deeper flood pools. As flood levels begin to rise, plant species that are not used to flooding will be affected. This will also change dynamics between flora and fauna by limiting food and habitat space. Also, increased agriculture and development are future threats. Protecting the callows and keeping it as a conservation area is vital to the survival of the unique array of organisms that call the callows home.

== Examples ==
- Shannon Callows
- River Suck Callows
- Little Brosna Callows
- Lough Eidin
- Callan, County Kilkenny
- Castletroy

== Literary references ==
- Patrick Deeley's novel The Lost Orchard deals with the protection of "The Callows", a marshy area.
