= Lough Eidin =

Lake in County Roscommon, Ireland

- Loch Éidin (Irish)
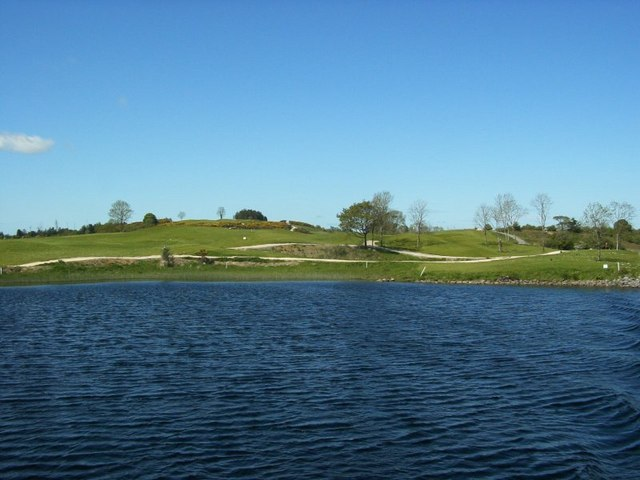
- View of the lough from Carrick-on-Shannon Golf Club.

- Location within Ireland
- Location: County Roscommon, Ireland
- Coordinates: 53.964327°N 8.143352°W
- Primary inflows: Boyle River
- Primary outflows: River Shannon
- Basin countries: Ireland
- Surface area: 2.8 km^{2} (1.1 sq mi)
- Surface elevation: 43 m (141 ft)
- Islands: Inishatirra
- Settlements: Carrick-on-Shannon

Lough Eidin, also known as Drumharlow Lake or Lough Drumharlow, is a lake in County Roscommon, Ireland, near Carrick-on-Shannon. It is on the Boyle River just above its junction with the Shannon.

== Wildlife ==
Roach, bream, brown trout and rudd are the main fish.

There are extensive callows on the shoreline, which is proposed as a Natural Heritage Area. A flock of Greenland white-fronted geese (Anser albifrons flavirostris) feed there.

== Regattas ==
A regatta was held on this lake in 1895, but the regatta was not repeated because the lake was too small.

== See also ==
- List of loughs in Ireland
