= Costello Chapel =

Catholic chapel in County Leitrim, Ireland

Coordinates: 53°56′43″N 8°05′43″W

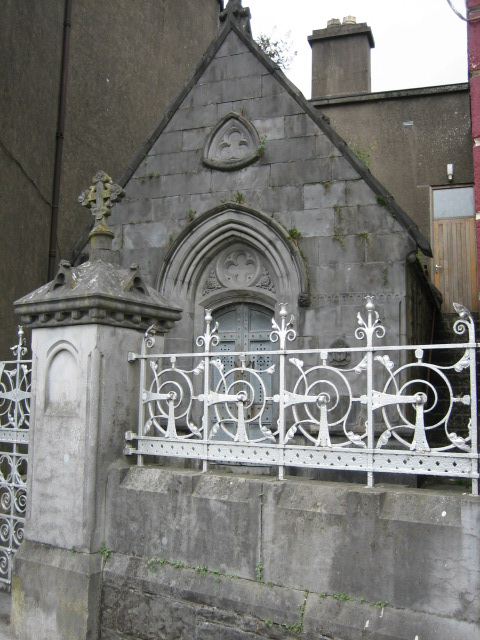

The Costello Chapel is a very small Catholic chapel located in Carrick-on-Shannon, County Leitrim, Ireland. It was built for Edward Costello in 1879, in memory of his wife, Mary Josephine, who alongside her husband is buried in the chapel. Measuring 16 foot by 12 foot, it is thought to be one of the world's smallest churches.
