= Cortober =

Village in County Roscommon, Ireland

Cortober Corr an Tobair
- Townland
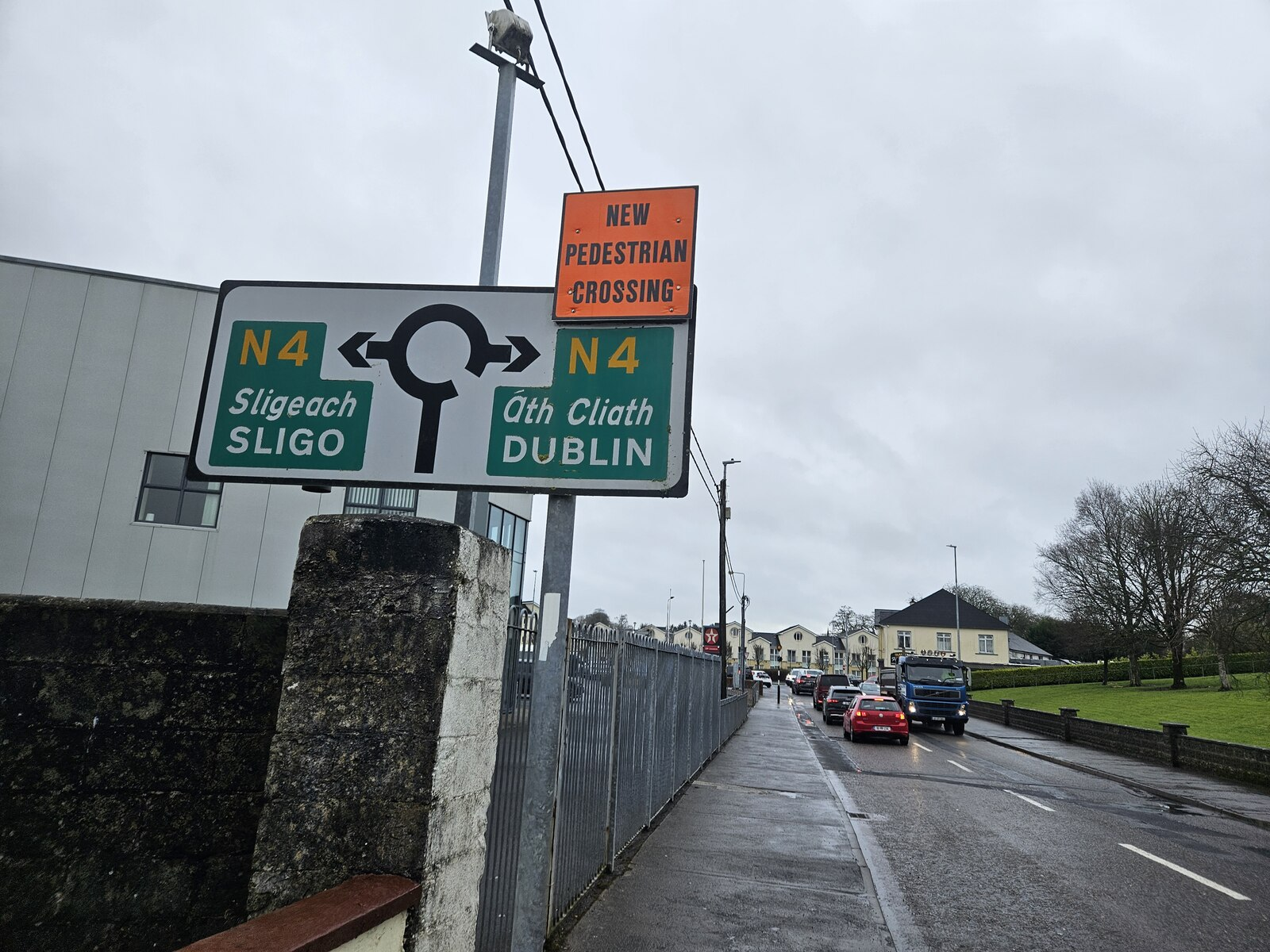
- The junction of the N4 and R368 roads is in Cortober

- Location in Ireland
- Coordinates: 53°56′17″N 8°06′04″W
- Country: Ireland
- Province: Connacht
- County: County Roscommon

Population (2011)
  - Total: 465
- Time zone: UTC+0 (WET)
  - Summer (DST): UTC-1 (IST (WEST))
- Irish Grid Reference: M941997

Cortober (Irish: Corr an Tobair, meaning 'round hill of the spring well') is a village and townland in County Roscommon, Ireland. It is located across the bridge from the town of Carrick-on-Shannon on the right bank of the River Shannon. It is bounded on the north by the parish of Tumna and River Shannon, on the east by the River Shannon, on the south by the townland of Cordrehead and Killukin and on the west by Mullaghmore. Although Cortober is its own separate village, it is usually grouped as part of Carrick-on-Shannon because it is almost adjacent. The N4 passes through the northern part of Cortober. From it, the R368 branches off towards the southwest.

== History ==
=== Hollywell House ===
A St. George Estate rental map for 1768 shows that Hollywell House in Cortober was then occupied by small cabins that surrounded the original 1623 fort of Liberty Hill, owned by Harris, Jones and King Families. Another rental of Charles Manners St. George Estate, dated 1842, gives a list of some early residents of Cortober townland, including Andersons, Armstrongs, Backhouses and Bournes.

=== Midland Great Western Railway ===
The Midland Great Western Railway built the Carrick on Shannon railway station in the townland, which was opened on 3 December 1862.

=== Rosary High School ===
During the early 1940s, there was no secondary school in the immediate Carrick-on-Shannon area. A local educator, Kathleen Lynch, felt that there was a need for the establishment of a secondary school to cater boys of neighbouring districts of North Roscommon and South Leitrim. On 8 September 1942, Kathleen Lynch (originally Mary Kathleen Mulhern of Drumlumman) opened the Rosary High School for boys at Cortober, on the Roscommon side of the bridge as well as South Leitrim. The opening was overseen by the Bishop of Elphin, Dr. Edward Doorly.
