= Boyle River (Ireland) =

Tributary of the Shannon in western Ireland

Coordinates: 53°57′30″N 08°24′21″W

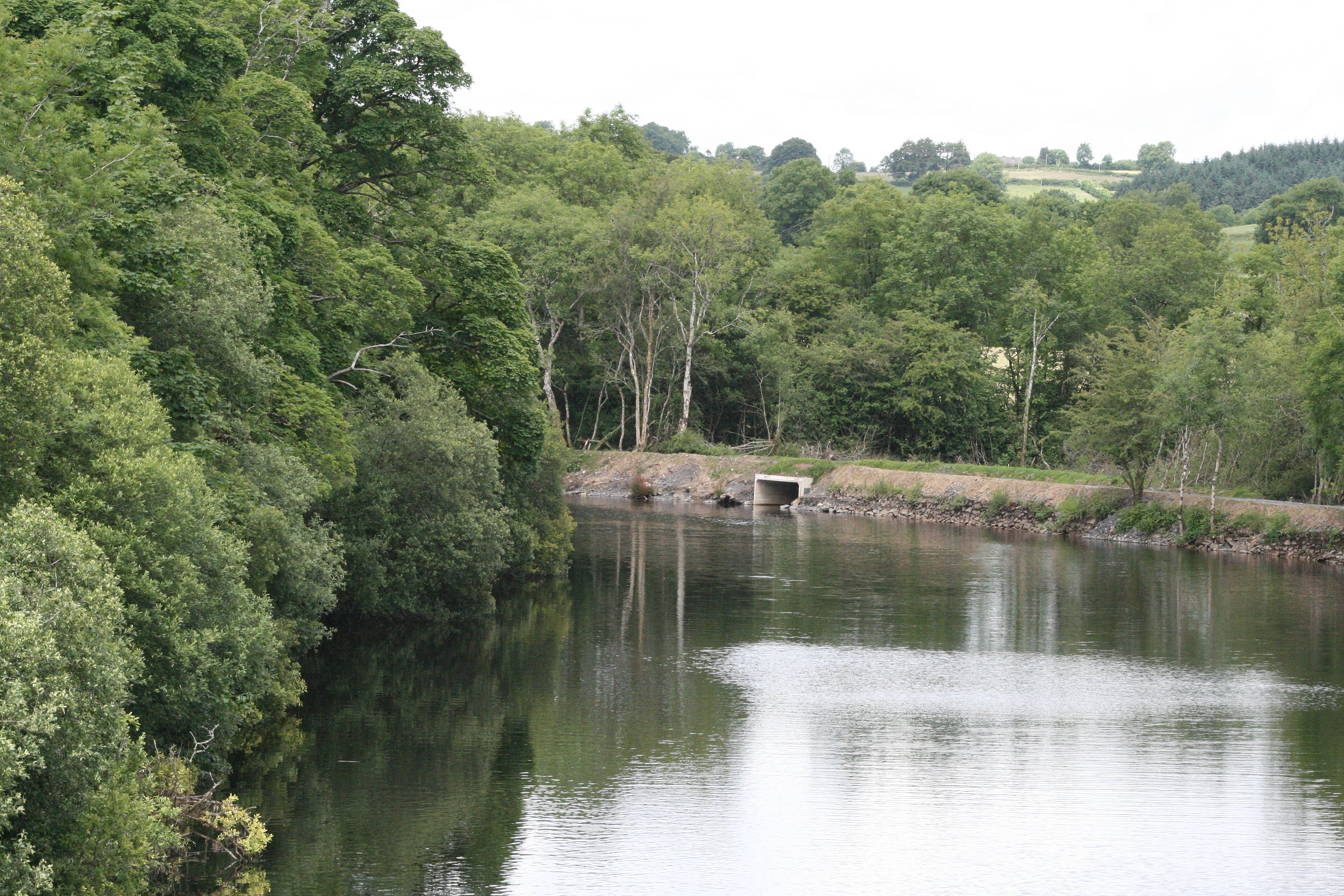
- Boyle River at Knockvicar.
- Native name: An Bhúill (Irish)

Physical characteristics
- Source
  - location: Lough Gara
- Mouth: River Shannon
  - location: Lough Eidin

The Boyle River is a river in Ireland. Forming part of the Shannon River Basin, it flows from Lough Gara on the Sligo/Roscommon county border and thence through the town of Boyle to Lough Key. From there is continues eastwards through the village of Knockvicar to the River Shannon at Lough Drumharlow, near Carrick-on-Shannon. The length of the Boyle River (from its source in County Mayo to the Shannon) is 64.4 km (40 mi). The area of its basin is 725 km^{2}.

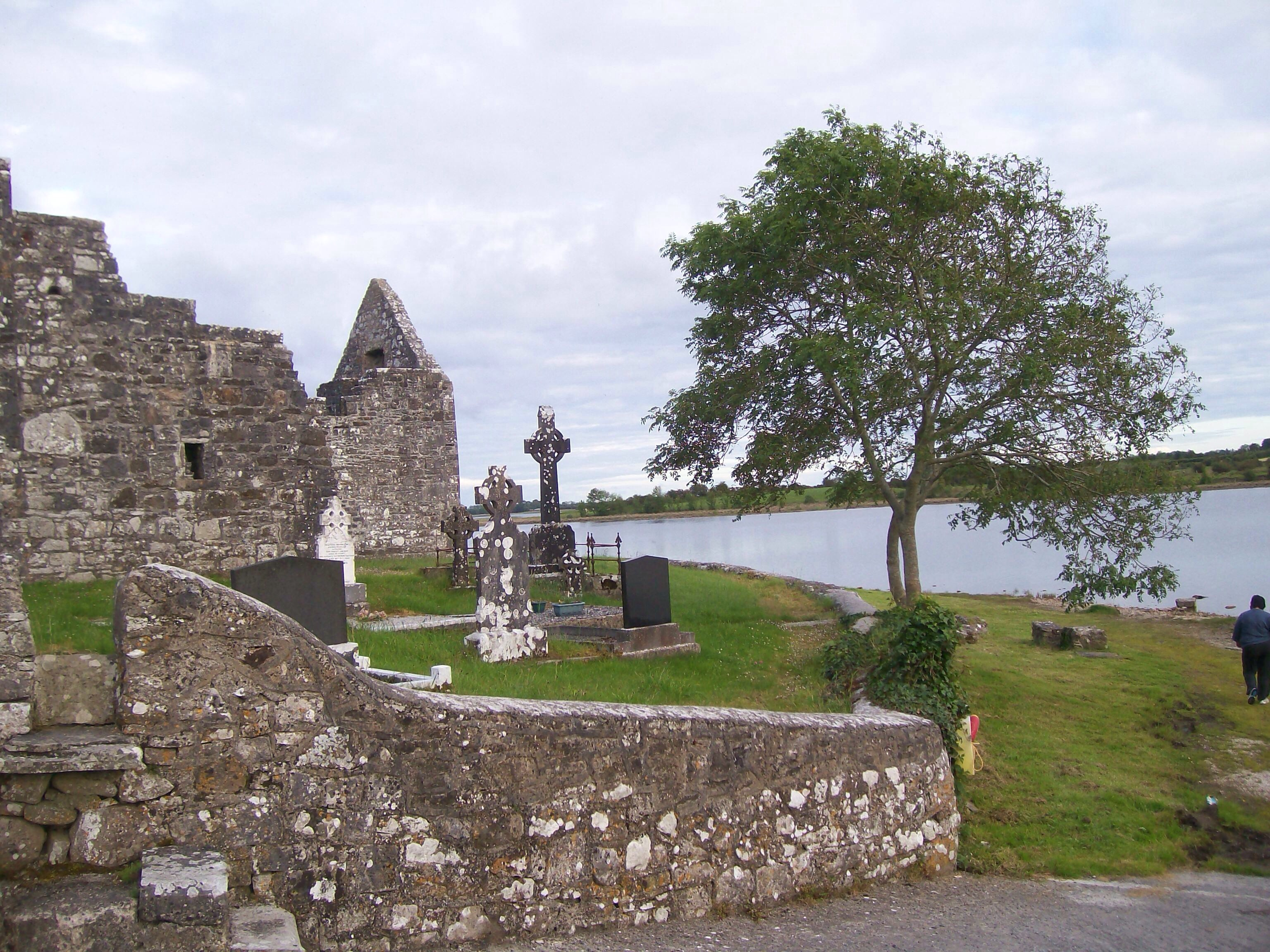
Urlaur Abbey on L. Urlaur Co. Mayo

== Boyle River Basin ==
The Upper Shannon catchment, above Carrick-on-Shannon (area: 1,301 km^{2}), has two distinct reaches, the River Shannon (basin area: 576 km^{2}), which rises in County Cavan, and the Boyle River (basin area: 725 km^{2}), with its source in County Mayo, which have their confluence at Lough Eidin/Drumharlow, approximately 4.7 km upstream of Carrick-On-Shannon.

The Boyle River has its origins in the rivers Lung and Breedoge, which flow into Lough Gara. The 29 km (18 mi) Lung River is fed by Urlaur Lough and Errit Lough on the Mayo/Roscommon border.

The river flow from the furthest reaches of the Boyle catchment to Limerick City has a measurement of 290 km (180ml). When added to the Shannon's 102.1 km (63.5ml) estuary, this gives a total river length of 392.1 km (243.5ml), which makes it the longest river within the Shannon River Basin (from source to mouth), 31.6 km (19.5ml) longer than the Shannon Pot source.

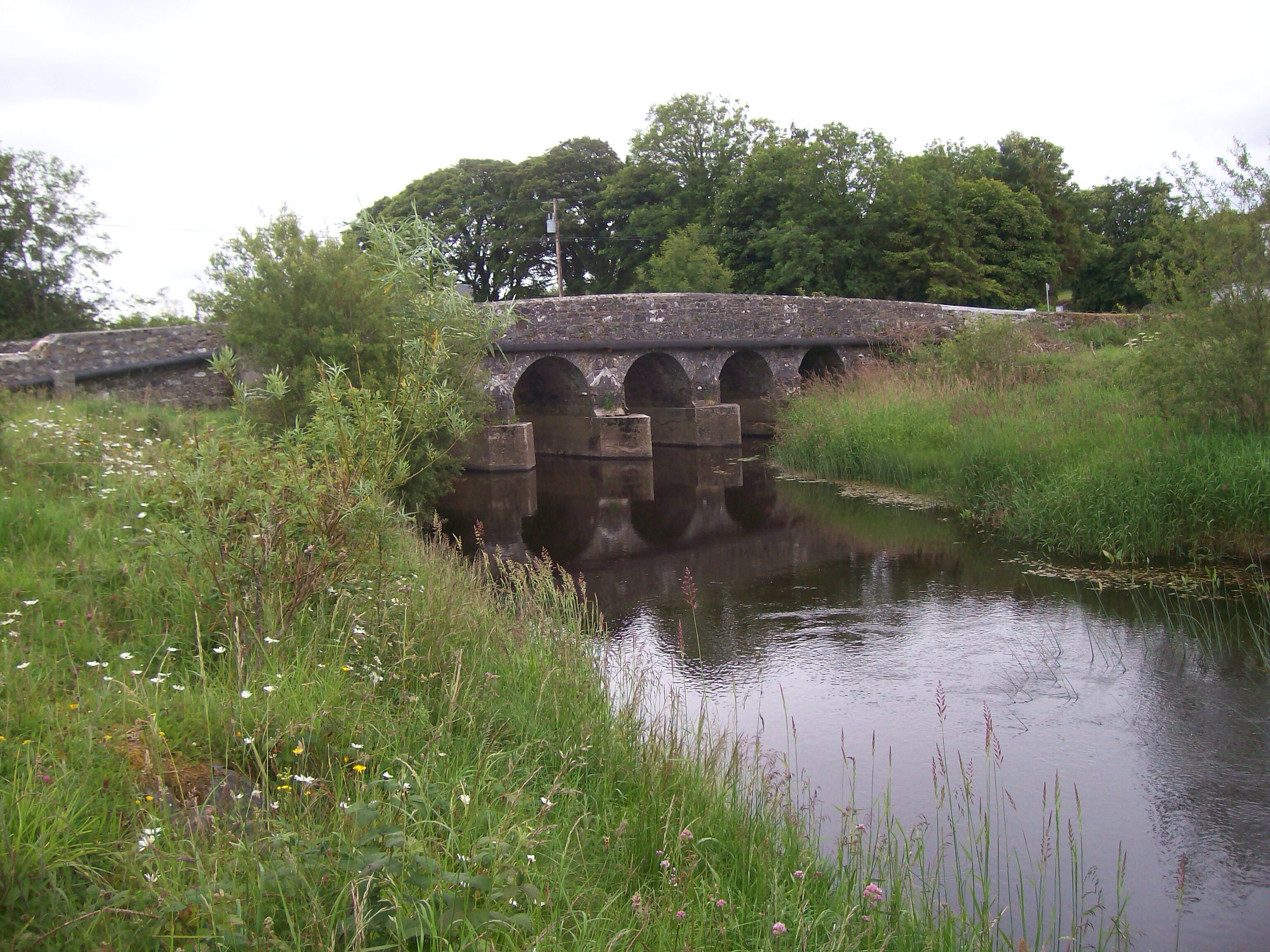
Lung River at Crunnaun Bridge near Ballaghaderreen Co. Roscommon

== See also ==
- Rivers of Ireland
- List of loughs of Ireland
- List of rivers of Ireland
