= Carrick-on-Shannon railway station =

Railway station in County Leitrim, Ireland

Carrick-on-Shannon Cora Droma Rúisc
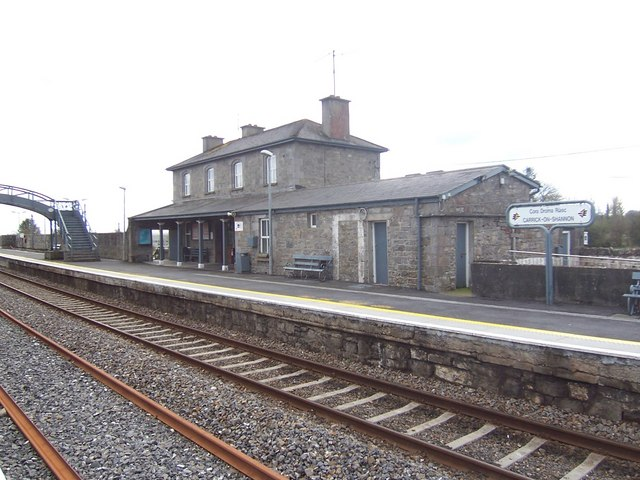
- Carrick-on-Shannon railway station

General information
- Location: Station Road, Cortober, Carrick-on-Shannon, County Leitrim, N41 X201; Ireland
- Coordinates: 53°56′17″N 8°6′22″W
- Owner: Iarnród Éireann
- Operator: Iarnród Éireann
- Platforms: 2
- Bus operators: TFI Local Link
- Connections: 567

Construction
- Structure type: At-grade

Other information
- Station code: CKOSH
- Fare zone: M

Key dates
- 1862: Station opened
Location

Carrick-on-Shannon railway station serves the town of Carrick-on-Shannon. Whilst the town itself is in County Leitrim, the railway station lies across the border in neighboring County Roscommon in the small area of Cortober or Mullaghmore.

The station opened on 3 December 1862, being designed by George Wilkinson, who also created nearby Dromod Station.

In 2025, local councilor Paddy Farrell decried the lack of updates and budget for updating the station, citing its growing need for maintenance.

== See also ==
- List of railway stations in Ireland

| Preceding station | Iarnród Éireann | Following station |
|---|---|---|
| Dromod | InterCity; Dublin-Sligo railway line | Boyle |
