= Lough Forbes =

Lake in Ireland (counties Longford, Roscommon)

- Loch Foirbis (Irish)
- Location within Ireland
- Location: County Longford/County Roscommon, Ireland
- Coordinates: 53.781322°N 7.877494°W
- Primary inflows: River Shannon
- Primary outflows: River Shannon
- Basin countries: Ireland
- Surface area: 3 km^{2} (1.2 sq mi)
- Surface elevation: 40 m (130 ft)
- Islands: Long Island, Sallow Island
- Settlements: Newtown Forbes

Lough Forbes (Irish: Loch Foirbis) is a lake and Special Area of Conservation in Ireland. It is on the border of counties Longford and Roscommon, west of the village of Newtownforbes.

== See also ==
- List of loughs in Ireland
