= Lung (river) =

River in Mayo and Roscommon, Ireland

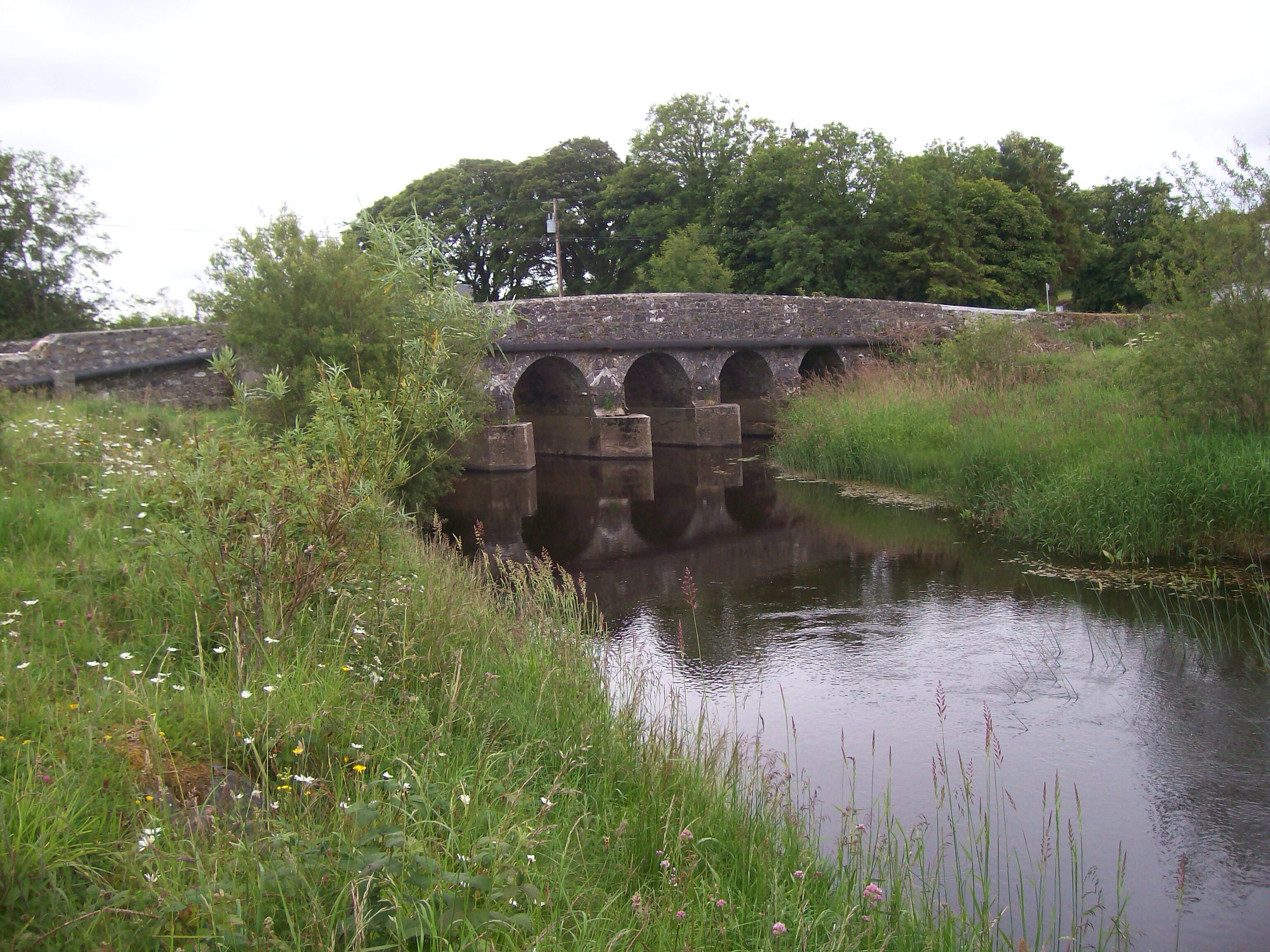
- Lung at Crunnaun Bridge

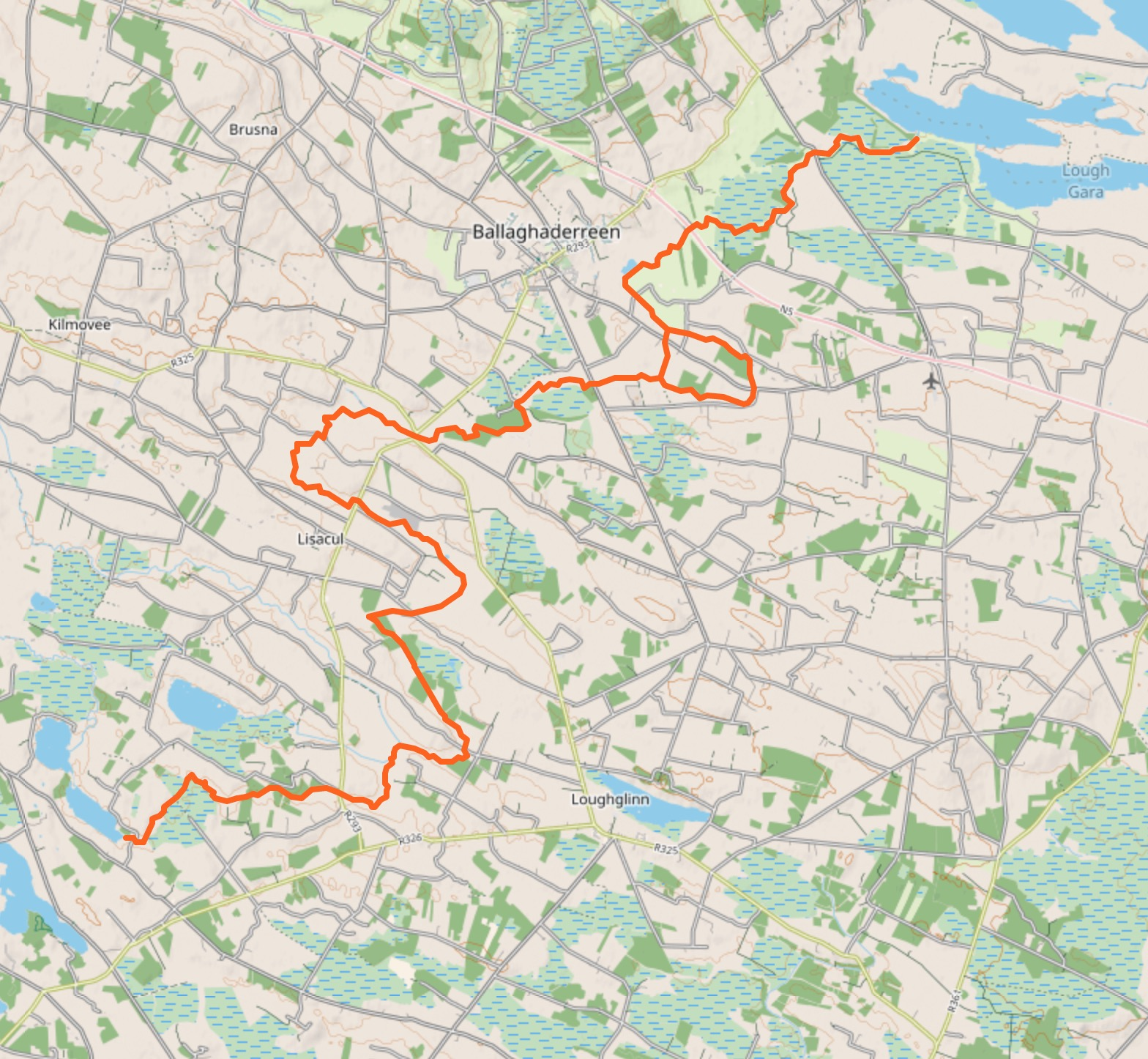
- Lung in red but missing initial course from source in Urlaur Lough in south-west of map
- Native name: Abhainn na Loinge (Irish)

Physical characteristics
- Mouth: Lough Gara
  - coordinates: 53°55′13″N 8°29′29″W
- Length: 18 m (59 ft)

The Lung is a river in Ireland flowing through counties Mayo and Roscommon. It runs in a generally north-easterly direction mainly through Mayo but also forms the border between the two counties in three places until it reaches Lough Gara near the town of Ballaghaderreen in County Roscommon. The river and its lakes provides facilities for anglers to fish.

== History ==
During the reign of King Irial, in the 12th century BC, the Lung became the natural boundary of the Luighne kingdom according to the Annals of the Four Masters and the borders were adopted by the modern Diocese of Achonry. The Lung Valley was ruled by the O'Haras and O'Garas until the 17th century.

The Lung area was associated with the festival of Lughnasa held in August. The National Museum holds items recovered from the Lung, such as weapons, cauldrons, and drinking cups from the Bronze Age in a Galloglass section. Legend has it that items were ritually thrown into the river however, they could be the result of skirmishes. During the Norman invasion forts were erected along the river by the Costellos whose principal settlement was at Castelmore, about 2 miles from Ballaghaderreen.

Under an 1840 act of Victoria, known as the County of Roscommon Act 1840, the Lord Lieutenant of Ireland was charged with annexing those non-contiguous townlands of counties Mayo and Roscommon to be combined with their respective counties thereby making the Lung the county boundary for those townlands.

== Geography ==
Urlaur Lough is where the Lung rises and flows about 22 km north-east to Lough Gara forming the Lung Valley. Near Lough Glynn, the Lung runs underground for about a mile and for the last 10 miles to Lough Gara it forms the boundary between counties Roscommon and Sligo. After Ballaghaderreen the river joins Lough Gara at its western corner.

In the 1840 the Lung was described as a slow meandering river occasionally forming turloughs and a mill situated about 3 miles upriver from Lough Gara would cease to function due to backwater. At that time the river banks and its basin were bogs.

Besides the outflow lake of Lough Gara and the source lake Lough Urlaur, there are four other lakes, Lough Eritt, Lough Cloonaugh, Lough Loughglynn and Lough Cloonaholly, that make up the Lung Valley.

Arterially drainage of the Lung took place over 35 years ago as far as Cloonroe Bridge, approximately 2 km from Errit Lough.

== Activities ==
The area is an angler's paradise, well served with access roads, parking, boat slips, fishing stands and walking trails as well as some facilities for physically impaired anglers. Fishing is a pastime enjoyed along the river and at Lough Gara where the most bountiful fish are roach, followed by roach/bream hybrids, perch, pike, bream, eels and brown trout.

"The Power House" of Ballaghaderreen generated electricity for the town from 1906 until 1933 though the first water powered turbine was installed in 1912 to harness the Lung for the power. Since decommissioning the building has been used as a science lab for the school, and later as a museum and art centre.
