= Knockvicar =

Village in County Roscommon, Ireland

Knockvicar Cnoc an Bhiocáire
- Village
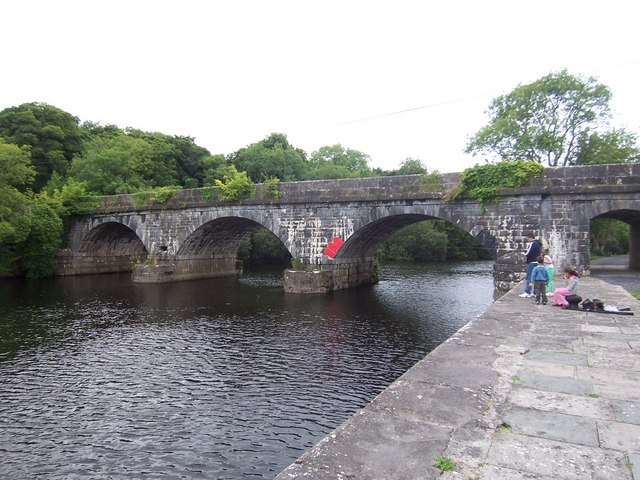
- Knockvicar Bridge

- Location in Ireland
- Coordinates: 54°00′04″N 8°11′35″W
- Country: Ireland
- Province: Connacht
- County: County Roscommon
- Elevation: 83 m (272 ft)

Population
  - Total: 294
- Time zone: UTC+0 (WET)
  - Summer (DST): UTC-1 (IST (WEST))
- Irish Grid Reference: G870060

Knockvicar (Irish: Cnoc an Bhiocáire) is a village in County Roscommon, Ireland. It is located on the R285 regional road, between Boyle and Carrick-on-Shannon near Lough Key Forest Park in the north of the county.

Knockvicar lies on the Arigna Scenic Drive off the N4 road from Dublin to Sligo

It is where the actress Maureen O'Sullivan spent part of her youth.

At Knockvicar bridge Donal Cam O'Sullivan Beare, the Irish Chieftain, after his defeat in Cork in 1603 travelled through the village of Knockvicar where his people rested for the last time before reaching O'Rourke's castle at Leitrim village.

In the late Middle Ages Knockvicar was the location of a Franciscan Priory.

The Boyle River, which flows under Knockvicar bridge, connects with Lough Key via a weir and Clarendon lock gates 300m upstream. People can park near the bridge and walk along the towpath.

Excavations at Kilteasheen on the Riversdale Estate of Mr. and Mrs. John Burke, were undertaken by Saint Louis University and the Institute of Technology-Sligo from 2005 to 2009.
