= Carrick-on-Shannon =

Town in County Leitrim, Ireland

Carrick-on-Shannon Cora Droma Rúisc (Irish)
- Town
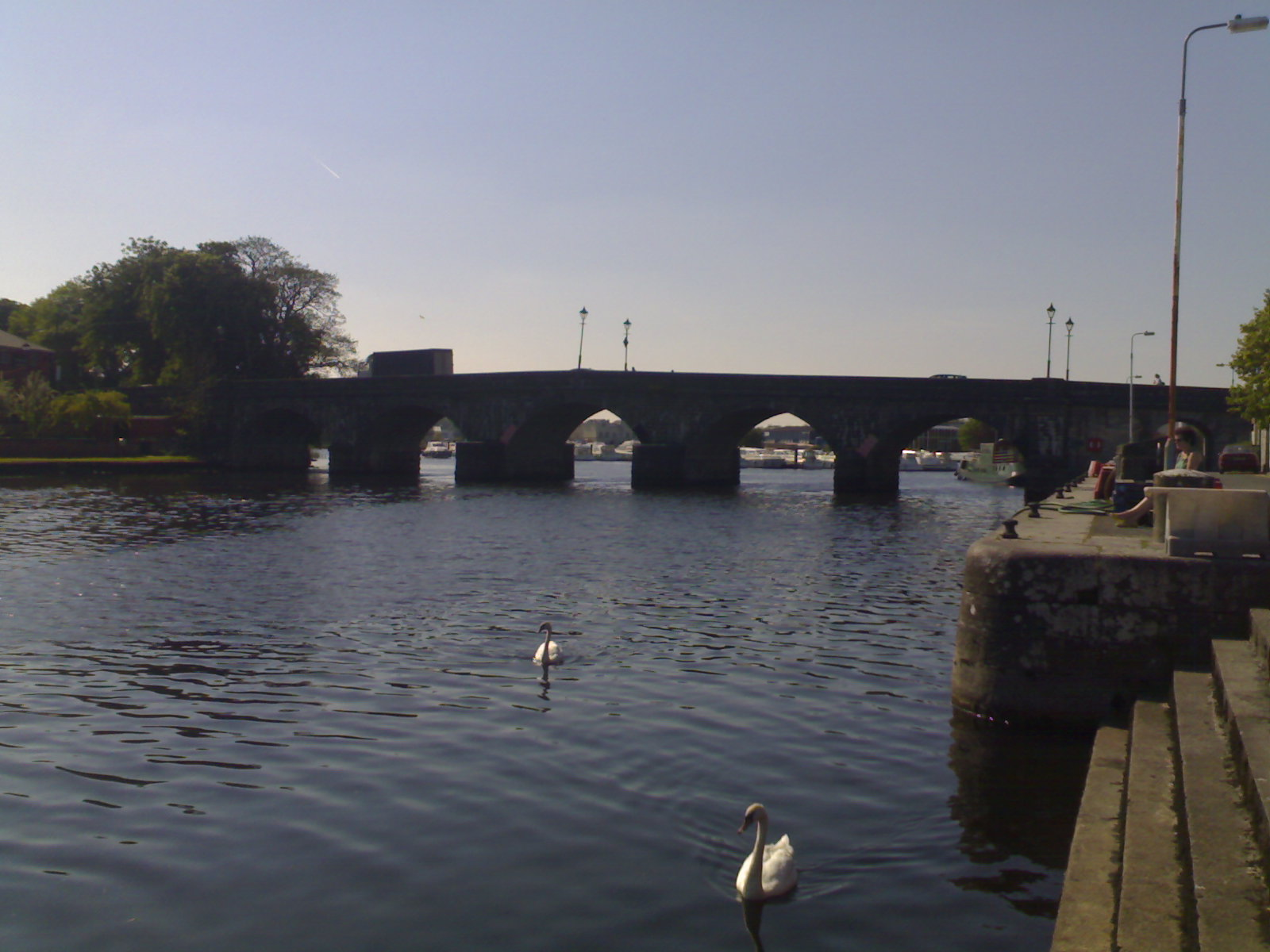
- The River Shannon at Carrick-on-Shannon

- Location in Ireland
- Coordinates: 53.944°N 8.095°W
- Country: Ireland
- Province: Connacht
- County: County Leitrim & County Roscommon
- Baronies: Leitrim and Boyle
- Elevation: 45 m (148 ft)

Population (2022)
  - Total: 4,743
- Time zone: UTC±0 (WET)
  - Summer (DST): UTC+1 (IST)
- Eircode routing key: N41
- Telephone area code: +353(0)71
- Irish Grid Reference: M935996
- Website: www.carrickonshannon.ie

Carrick-on-Shannon (Irish: Cora Droma Rúisc, meaning 'weir of the marshy ridge') is the county town of County Leitrim in Ireland. It is the largest town in the county. A smaller part of the town located on the west bank of the River Shannon lies in County Roscommon and is home to the town's main train station. As of the 2022 census, the population of the town was 4,743. It is situated on a strategic crossing point of the River Shannon. The main part of the town, the County Leitrim part, is in the civil parish of Kiltoghert, which is in the barony of Leitrim, while Cortober, which is the County Roscommon side of the town, is in the civil parish of Killukin, in the barony of Boyle.

== History ==
Carrick-on-Shannon is situated on a fording point of the Shannon. In the vicinity of Drumsna, on the County Roscommon border, are the remains of an Iron Age fortification. Corryolus townland on the Shannon (Irish: Coraidh-Eoluis, meaning 'weir of Eolais') remembers Eolais Mac Biobhsach, ancestor of the Muintir Eolais who were the most famous ancient Leitrim sub-septs in the Barony of Mohill and the Barony of Leitrim. Following the Norman invasion of Ireland, a famous Battle of Áth an Chip occurred near Carrick-on-Shannon.

On old maps, the town was also known as Carrick Drumrusk and Carrikdrumrusk, being an anglicised variant of the Irish name of the town. Carrick-on-Shannon was granted a royal charter and named a borough with its own seal in 1607. Throughout at least the 19th and 20th centuries, three annual fairs were held at Carrick on- 12 May, 11 August, and 21 November (or 22nd). Historic buildings are the "Carrick Castle", the Workhouse and Famine Graveyard, Hatley Manor (a restored Georgian period home of the St. George Family), St George's Church of Ireland and the Costello Chapel.

The present council buildings are the site of the Old Gaol, which was a prison that can date back as far as the 18th Century. There was a smaller jailhouse which still stands today, built in the 1700s. This was replaced by a much larger Prison in the 1800s. The Gaol was mostly Demolished in the 1960s.

Carrick is considered the gateway to the Shannon–Erne Waterway, Lough Key, Acres Lake and Lough Allen via the villages of Cootehall, Knockvicar, Jamestown, Leitrim Village, Drumshanbo and Keshcarrigan and is only a short distance away from the Glens of North Leitrim.

== Local media ==
Carrick-on-Shannon is served by the Leitrim Observer which is published every Wednesday and the fortnightly free Northwest Express newspapers. The Leitrim Post is now defunct.

== Places of interest ==
=== Carrick Bridge and Quay ===
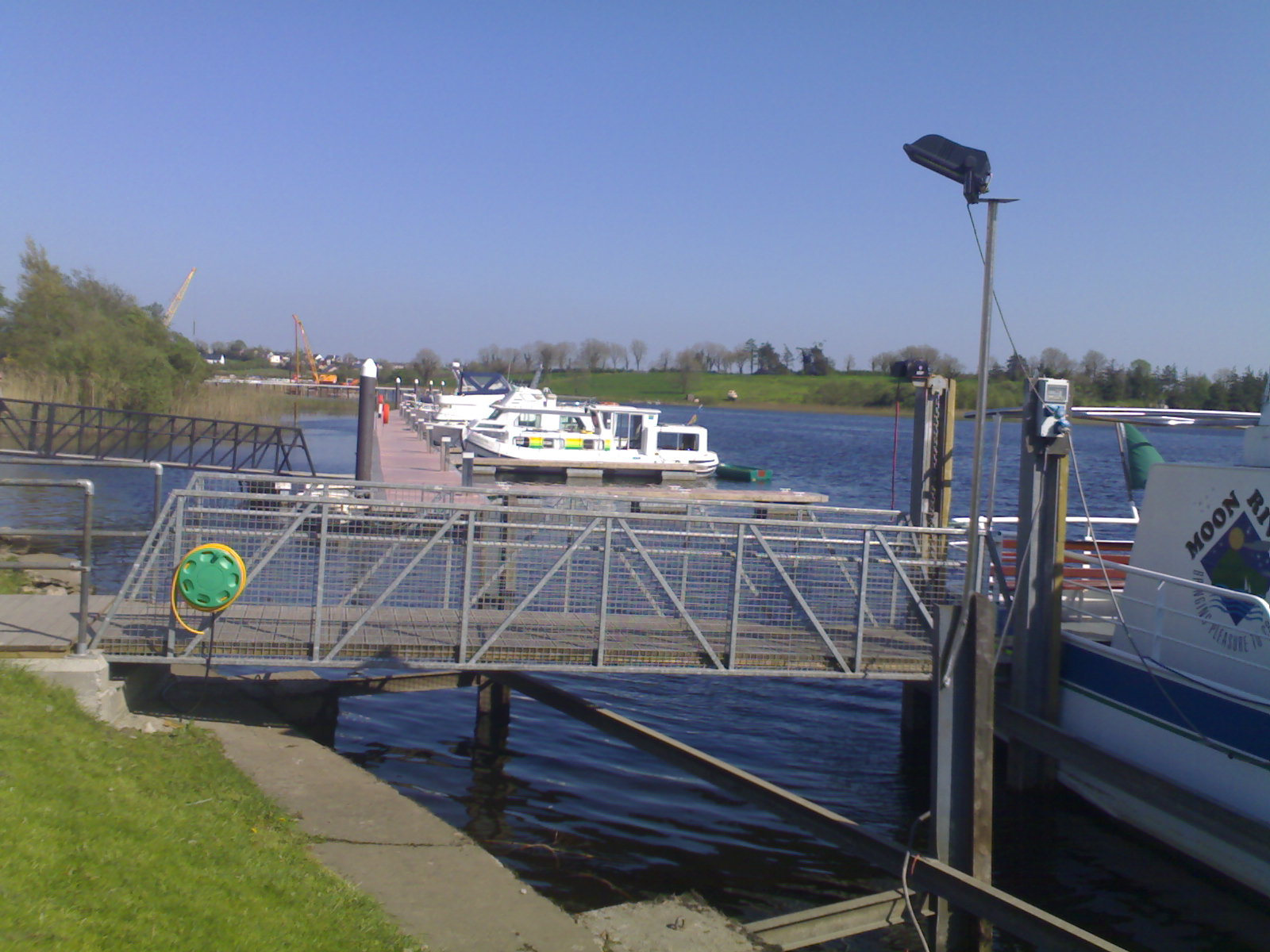
The Quayside

Until the early 19th century, the head of the Shannon Navigation was Drumsna. In the 1840s the improvement of the navigation entailed extensive dredging of the river, the cutting of Jamestown Canal, the construction of locks at Drumsna and Knockvicar, and the building of a new bridge and Quays at Carrick-on-Shannon. The new bridge, built in 1846, took the place of a nine arch stone bridge, which in turn replaced a wooden structure.

For over a century, until the closing of the Grand Canal Company in 1960, Carrick was a major depot for river trade; timber, cement, hardware, and especially Guinness stout were all transported here from Dublin, Athlone, and Limerick.

=== Churches ===
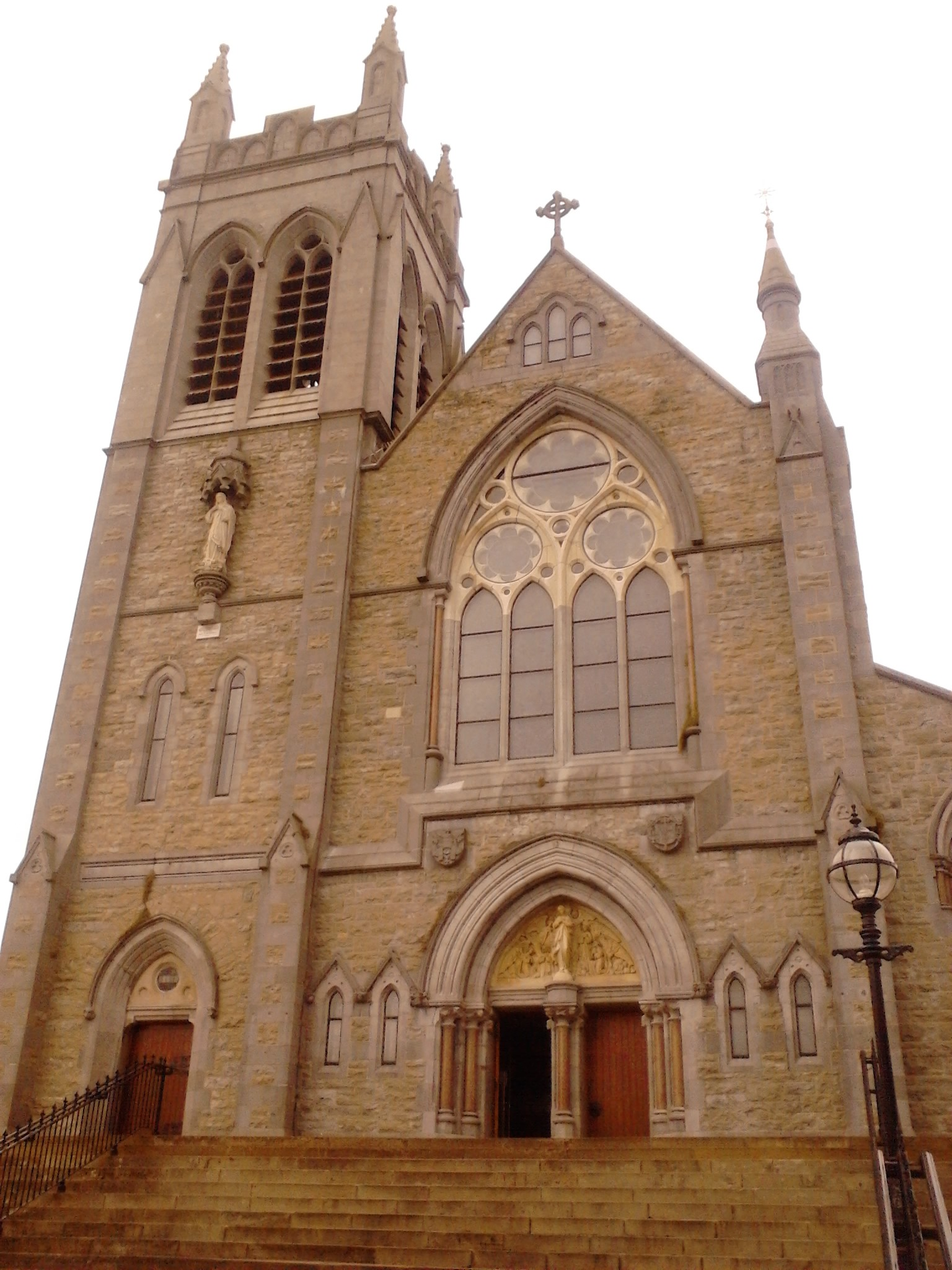
Front façade, St Mary's Catholic Church

St. Mary's Catholic Church, on the Main Street, is built in the Neo-Gothic style. It was designed by W.H. Hague, a Dublin architect. It was dedicated on 19 October 1879. The church is on a plot of elevated ground. Fr. Thomas Fitzgerald, the priest responsible for its construction, is buried within the chancel in front of the Blessed Sacrament Altar. The town is in the parish of Kiltoghert in the Roman Catholic Diocese of Ardagh and Clonmacnoise.

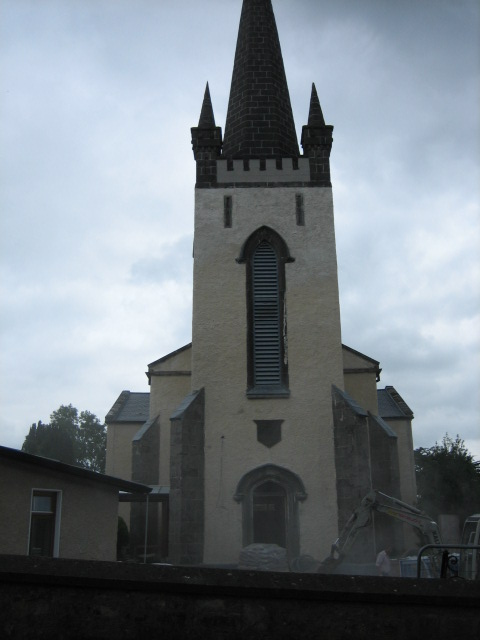
St George's Church of Ireland

St. George's Church, St. Mary's Close, is the Church of Ireland parish Church. Prior to 1698, the parish church was situated at Kiltoghert. In that year it was transferred to its present site in Carrick. It was re-built in 1829 and the interior reconstructed in the years 1910–1914. Rev. W.A. Percy who was Rector from 1869 to 1886 was the grandfather of the famous songwriter Percy French.

The Priest's Lane is a long-standing name for the road leading from Main Street to St. Patrick's Park. This was where the Catholic clergy first lived after the relaxation of the Penal Laws. It is also reputed to have been the home of Turlough O'Carolan, the harpist and composer when he came to Carrick as a boy with his family from Nobber, County Meath in 1684.

The Carrick Baptist Church was founded in September 2012. The church holds its services on Park Lane.

The Costello Memorial Chapel, said to be the second smallest chapel in the world, has an area of 192 sq ft (18 m^{2}).

=== Arts ===
The Dock is an arts centre housed in the renovated 19th century courthouse building. It was opened in 2005 and hosts a theatre, art galleries, artists' studios, workshop spaces, a coffee shop and bar as well as The Leitrim Design House. Since 2013, it has held the Phase One festival held at the beginning of April every year, dedicated to displaying artists and musicians associated with modern or electronic music. The Carrick Water Music Festival, a week long music and arts festival which began in 2005 is held every July.

== Climate ==
Carrick on Shannon experiences a year-round mild, moist, temperate and changeable climate, due to the prevailing winds of the Gulf Stream. The town experiences a lack of temperature extremes, with temperatures below 0 °C (32 °F) and above 30 °C (86 °F) being rare. The town receives an average of 1,147 mm (45.2") of precipitation annually, which is evenly distributed throughout the year. Rain is the most common form of precipitation - hail, sleet and snow are rare in the town, though will sometimes be experienced during particularly cold winters. Carrick-on-Shannon is also consistently humid, with humidity normally ranging from 70% to 100%, and this can lead to heavy showers, and even thunderstorms breaking out when drier east winds, originating in the European continent, clash with this humidity particularly in the late summer.

The average January temperature in the town is 6.8 °C (40.6 °F) and the average July temperature is 16.0 °C (60.8 °F). This means that Carrick-on-Shannon is said to have a maritime temperate climate (Cfb) according to the Köppen climate classification system.

== Geography ==
As its name implies, the town is located on the River Shannon, which is linked to the River Erne via the Shannon–Erne Waterway. The town is located on the N4 National Primary Route, linking Dublin in the east to Sligo in the west. The road is of motorway status for much of its length.

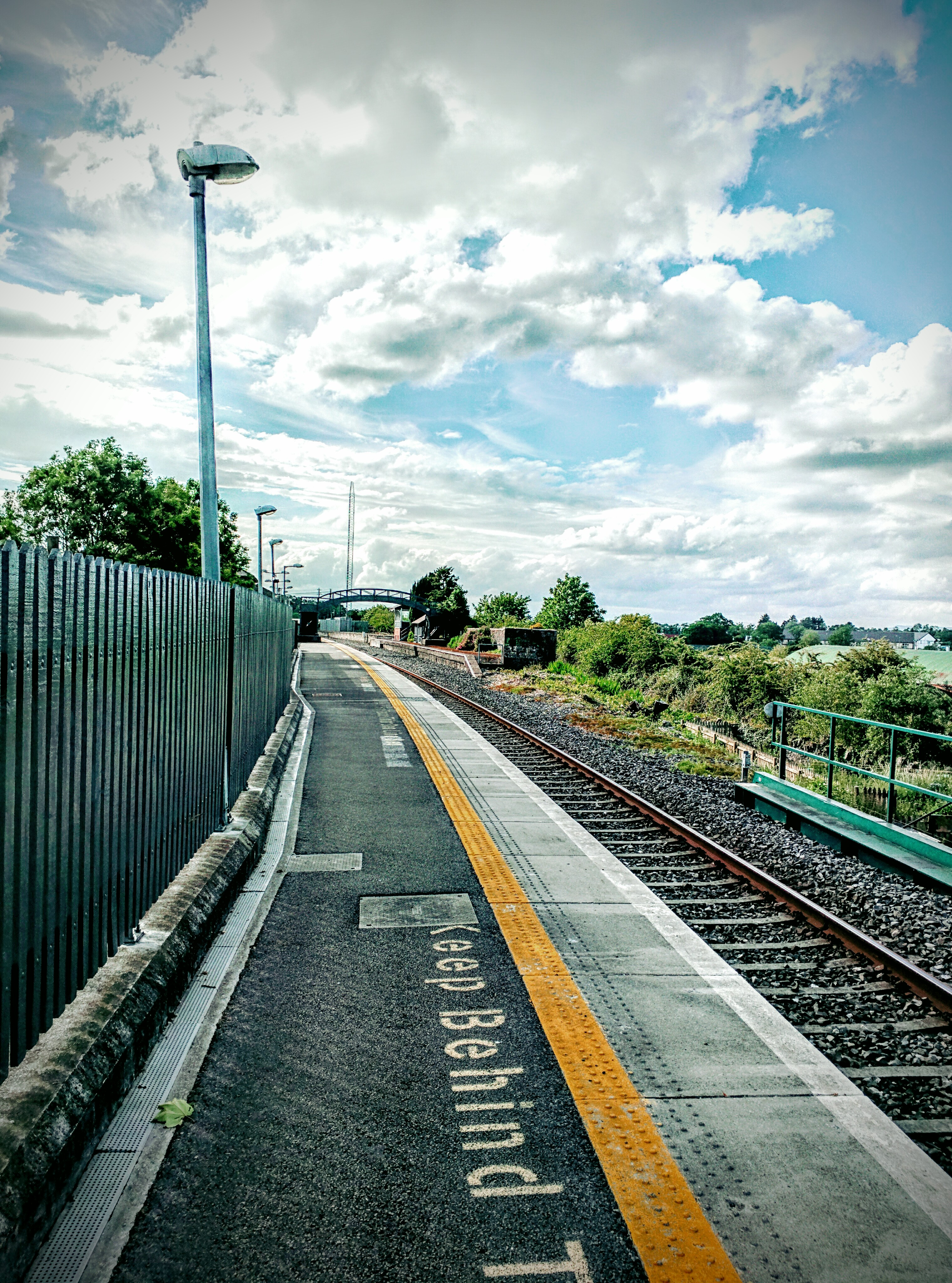
Carrick-on-Shannon railway station

The town is served by the Dublin-Sligo railway line. Carrick-on-Shannon railway station opened on 3 December 1862. This line was originally part of the Midland Great Western Railway. The railway station is approximately 2 kilometres outside town on the Roscommon side of the Shannon. Bus Éireann bus services connect the town to Dublin and Sligo.

There is a regular Local Link bus service to Ballinamore via Mohill.

Carrick-on-Shannon, while the county town of Leitrim, straddles the river Shannon. That part of the town on the Roscommon side is the townland of Cortober.

The Leitrim part of the town is situated in the townland of Townparks which is part of the extensive civil parish of Kiltoghert, while the Roscommon part is in the parish of Killukin.

== Carrick Carnival ==
"Carrick Carnival" is an annual festival based in the town which takes place around the June Bank Holiday weekend.

Lasting about 10 days, events include air shows, water sports, fireworks, and live music. During the latter half of the Carnival, larger events take place including Carnival Night, the Battle of the Musicals, Taste of Carrick, Vintage Car Displays and much more.

== Sport ==
St Mary's GAA club is based in the parish of Kiltoghert. The club, which was originally founded in 1889 and re-formed in 1944, has its grounds at Pairc Naoimh Mhuire. The Roscommon side of the town is served by Shannon Gaels GAA. The home ground of Leitrim GAA, Páirc Seán Mac Diarmada, is also in Carrick-on-Shannon.

In soccer, Carrick Town FC was founded in 1976. The home ground is located at the Showgrounds on the Boyle Road. In rugby, Carrick-on-Shannon RFC was established in 1974.

Golf was first played in Carrick-on-Shannon in 1910. The townland of Ballinamoney was first the first site for a golf course. In 1936 Carrick-on-Shannon Golf Club moved to a site nearer the town in Lisnagot. In 1944 it moved to its present location in Woodbrook.

Carrick on Shannon Rowing Club was founded in 1836 and is the oldest rowing club in Ireland as well as one of the oldest in Europe. The locality has hosted national and international angling competitions.

== Notable residents ==
- Frances Cryan (b. 1958), Olympian Ladies Rowing at 1980 Moscow Olympics. 11 times Irish Ladies Single Sculls Champion from the years 1976-1986 inclusive.
- Carole Coleman (b. 1966), Raidió Teilifís Éireann broadcaster.
- William Lendrim (1830–1891), Victoria Cross recipient.
- Farrell McElgunn (b. 1932), former local politician and member of the Seanad and the European Parliament
- Paul Reid (born 1964) – senior civil servant

== Twinning ==
Carrick-on-Shannon is twinned with Cesson-Sévigné in Brittany, France.

== See also ==
- List of towns and villages in Ireland
- Market Houses in Ireland
