= Ó Gadhra =

Ó Gadhra or O'Gara is an Irish surname which originated in the kingdom of Luighne Connacht. Variants include Garry, Geary, Gerry, and Guiry.

== Background ==
According to historian C. Thomas Cairney, the O'Garas were one of the chiefly families of the "race of Luighne" or "Lugh" who came from the tribe of Cianacht who in turn were from the Dumnonii or Laigin who were the third wave of Celts to settle in Ireland during the first century BC.

The first O'Garas were descendants of the Gailenga people. Their descendants were located in Sliabh Lugha (later known as the barony of Gallen), the southern part of the territory ruled by the Kings of Luighne Connacht.

In the 13th century they were expelled from the area (by the Clan Mac Siúrtáin) and moved to Cul Ui Fionn, later known as the barony of Coolavin, County Sligo.

== Notable bearers of the name ==
- Domhnall mac Gadhra, King of Luighne Connacht, died 931.
- Toichleach Ua Gadhra, King of Gailenga, died 964.
- Donn Sléibhe Ua Gadhra, King of Sliabh Lugha, died 1181.
- Ruaidrí Ó Gadhra, last King of Sliabh Lugha, died 1256.
- Ruaidri Ó Gadhra, Irish lord, died 1285.
- Fearghal Ó Gadhra, lord of Coolavin, patron of the Annals of the Four Masters, c. 1597-after 1660.
- Oliver O'Gara, Irish soldier and politician of the 17th century
- John Patrick O'Gara, French-born soldier in the Spanish Army
- Nollaig Ó Gadhra (1943-2008) Irish-language activist, journalist and historian
- Charles O'Gara (1699-1777), courtier and official of the Holy Roman Empire
- Matt O'Gara, Irish sportsperson, fl. 1960.
- Máirín Ní Gadhra, Irish broadcaster and writer,born 1971
- Ronan O'Gara, Irish rugby union rugby player, born 1977.
- Eoghan O'Gara, Irish sportsperson, born 1985.

== See also ==
- Ó Gadhra Chiefs of the Name
- Kings of Sliabh Lugha
- Kings of Luighne Connacht
- Irish clans
