= Ó Gadhra Chiefs of the Name =

Irish clan leaders

The Ó Gadhra Chiefs of the Name were the heads of the Clan O'Gara, who were originally located in Sliabh Lugha (formerly known as Gailenga), the southern part of the territory ruled by the Kings of Luighne Connacht. In the 13th century they were expelled from the area and moved to Cul Ui Fionn, later known as the barony of Coolavin, County Sligo.

The first to bear the surname was Ruaidrí Ua Gadhra, rígdomna of Luigne, who died in 1059.

== Chiefs ==
- Ruaidri Ó Gadhra, died 1285.
- Brian Ó Gadhra, died 1325.
- Donough Roe Ó Gadhra, died 1328.
- Diarmaid Ó Gadhra, alive 1328.
- Ó Gadhra

== See also ==
- Kings of Luighne Connacht
- Kings of Sliabh Lugha
