= Dolan (surname) =

Dolan (Irish: Ó Dubhláin, Ó Dúláin, Ó Duibhlin, Ó Dubhshláin,) is a surname of Irish origin. The name Dolan is fairly common today in Ulster, particularly in Cavan, Fermanagh and Tyrone, and also in the Connacht Counties of Roscommon and Galway. The latter is the place of origin of this sept which is a branch of the Ui Máine (Hy Many) specifically in the Clonmacnowen Barony in Galway and in the Barony of Athlone in Roscommon.

== History ==
=== In Sligo ===
The Dolan family traces its origin back to Fiacha Suighe, who was the son of Fedlimid Rechtmar, the High King of Ireland from 110 AD to 119 AD. Fiacha's brother, Conn of the Hundred Battles, was also High King. Fiacha's descendants were called the Dal Fiachrach Suighe. The Dolan branch of this clan settled in counties Sligo and Mayo and take their name from Dobhailen, the son of Gormghus. They were lords of the tuath of Corran (barony) in County Sligo. The Annals of the Four Masters under the year 885 state- Dobhailen, son of Gormghus, lord of Luighne Connacht, died. He was of the tribe of Corca Firthri, and from him the Ui Dobhailen are descended. The Corca Fhir Trí were located in the kingdom of Gailenga (later the barony of Gallen, County Mayo), Luighne Connacht and Corann (baronies of Leyney and Corann, County Sligo) in Gaelic Ireland. The first Mac Dolan was Dobhailen's son Uathmarán and his descendants were then called O'Dolan, meaning the grandchildren or descendants of Dobhailen. The Annals of the Four Masters under the year 920 state- Uathmharan, son of Dobhailen, lord of Luighne in Connaught, died. The Irish name O'Dobhailen is anglicised as O'Dolan or O'Devlin, depending on local accents and dialect. The family is different to the Devlin family of County Tyrone, who are descended from the Uí Néill.

Later mentions of the family in the Annals include-

928: Maol Da Bhonna, son of Dobhailen, lord of Luighne, and Muircheartach, son of Eagra, lord of Luighne, were slain.

944: Domhnall, son of Uathmharan, son of Dobhailen, lord of Corca-Firtri, died.

946: Domnall son of Mael Muadh, king of the Luigne of Connacht, was killed by the son of Uathmurán son of Dobailén and the Corco Fir Trí.

984: Diarmaid, son of Uathmharan, lord of Luighne, died.

994: Fogartach mac Diarmuda, maic Uathmuran, rí Corco Tri Chonnacht, was slain by the Gailenga of Choraind (Corann).

1031: Cusleibhe Ua Dobhailen [Cú sleibi h-úa Dobuilén], chief of Corca-Firtri, was treacherously slain.

1035: Cú Sléibhe, mac Dobhrain, tigherna Corca Fir Trí, d'écc.

1248: Faghartach Ua Dobhailén, Lord of Corran in the county of Sligo, died.

1309: Hugh, the son of Owen, son of Rory, son of Hugh, son of Cathal Crovderg, King of Connaught, and worthy heir to the monarchy of Ireland, the most hospitable and expert at arms of all the Irish born in his time, was slain by Hugh Breifneach, the son of Cathal O'Conor, at Coill-an-clochain, together with many of the chiefs of his people about him. Among these were Conor Mac Dermot; Dermot Roe, son of Teige O'Conor; Dermot, son of Cathal Carragh Mac Dermot; Hugh, son of Murtough, son of Teige, son of Mulrony; and Dermot O'Healy, a princely brughaidh, the best of his time. On the other side fell Gilla-na-naev Mac Egan, Chief Brehon of Connaught, and the most illustrious of the Brehons of his time; Faghartach Ua Dobailén, and others not mentioned.

1316: A very great army was mustered by Felim O'Conor and the chiefs of the province of Connaught....They all marched to Athenry. The English of West Connaught mustered their forces, to oppose them, namely, William Burke; the Baron Mac Feorais Bermingham, Lord of Athenry; and the greater part of the English of Leath Chuinn. A fierce and spirited engagement took place between them, in which the Irish were at last defeated. Felim O'Conor, from whom the Irish had expected more than from any other Gael then living, was slain. There were also slain.....Gilla-na-naev, son of Dailredocair Ua Dobhailén, who was O'Conor's standard-bearer.

Triallam timcheall na Fodla written about 1372 by Seán Mór Ó Dubhagáin gives a listing of the Irish chiefs. He refers to the Dolans as- O'Dobhailén co nDeaghbhloidh (meaning 'O'Dolan of good fame').

The Great Book of Lecan compiled c. 1400 states- The race of Fiachu Suigde, son of Feidlimid Rechtmar, namely: Corcu Fir Tri at Corann in Connacht, of whom was Diarmaid Ua Duibne, and the Ui Chuinn with their families, formerly petty kings of Corcu Fir Tri until the race of Tadg son of Cian son of Ailill Aulom from Munster dispossessed them: and of Corcu Fir Tri are the Ui Dobailén and Ui Duinnchaichig and Ui Ailella, of whom was Mac Liag the poet. The Dési, moreover, are of the race of Fiachu Suigde; they, with their under-septs, contain ten tricha céts, not reckoning the Semaine, i.e., a half tricha cét who are descended from Semuine son of Cechang son of Celtar or from Semaine son of Celtchar son of Uithechar106 when the consequence of slaying Blai Brugaid through jealousy in his fort went against Celtchar; and the Dési of Brega are not reckoned therein i.e. in the ten tricha céts). Fir Bili and Fir Asail are of the race of Fiachu Suigde.

A folklore account of the Dolans of Sligo is given in the 1836 'Ordnance Survey Letters, Sligo'. Patrick O'Keefe's letter of 12 September 1836 gives an account of 'O'Doláin Duinn' whom he associates with Feenagh Lough (Feenaghmore townland, Toomour parish, Corran barony). In the Patent Rolls of King James I, a grant to Sir James Fullerton dated 28 January 1608 includes the four townlands surrounding Feenagh Lough which were collectively called 'Balligolan', probably a corruption of the Irish Baile Uí Dobhailén, meaning "Dolan's Town".

In the 1826 Tithe Applotment Books there were 19 Dolans who were paying tithes in County Sligo.

=== In Fermanagh ===
The family is not mentioned in the Annals after 1316 but their history was continued by a family member in 1718, John Dolan of Fermanagh, which is viewable on JSTOR. John Dolan states (p. 287) that in 1528 the O'Dolans took the side of the O'Rourkes in a battle against the O'Connor Sligo. They lost the battle and so were expelled from their ancestral home in Corran. They first took refuge with the O'Rourkes in Leitrim. Then Cú Connacht Óg mac Con Connacht Maguire, who was chief of Fermanagh from 1527 to 1538, was in a war with his relatives and offered the O'Dolans land in Fermanagh if they would fight for him. They agreed and Maguire granted 16 tates or townlands in Clanawley barony to Tigernán O'Dolan, the son of the chief of the clan. The Dolans remained owners until the Plantation of Ulster when their land was confiscated by the English. An Inquisition held in Devenish, County Fermanagh on 7 July 1603 listed the chief freeholders in the barony of Clanawley, among whom were Montery Doelan. This is an Anglicisation of "Muintir Uí Dhóláin" meaning 'The Family of O'Dolan'. After the Plantation the O'Dolans fought under the Maguires in the 1641 Rebellion and the Williamite wars. The family became hereditary erenaghs of Templerushin church beside Holywell village.

In Pender's 1659 Census of Fermanagh there were four people named Dolan over the age of 15.

In the 1826 Tithe Applotment Books there were 7 Dolans who were paying tithes in County Fermanagh.

=== In Leitrim & Cavan ===
The Elizabethan Fiants list several Dolans (spelled O'Dolan, O'Doylane, etc.)

At the end of the 16th century Bryan Dolan lived in the parish of Killargue, probably on land granted to his family there by the O'Rourkes. John O'Hart in his 1892 book Irish pedigrees; or, The origin and stem of the Irish nation, sets out the subsequent history of that branch of the family in Leitrim and Cavan, on pages 413–416.

In Pender's 1659 Census of Leitrim there were nine people named Dolan over the age of 15.

In the 1826 Tithe Applotment Books there were 156 Dolans who were paying tithes in County Leitrim.

In the 1826 Tithe Applotment Books there were 256 Dolans who were paying tithes in County Cavan.

== Notable Dolans ==
=== Arts and entertainment ===
- B. Dolan (born 1981), American hip hop artist and poet
- Charles Dolan (1926–2024), founder of HBO and chairman of Cablevision
- Ellen Dolan (born 1955), American actress
- The Dolan Twins, former Viners, now YouTubers
  - Ethan Dolan (born 1999), YouTube creator
  - Grayson Dolan (born 1999), YouTube creator
- Geoff Dolan (born 1964), New Zealand entertainer
- James L. Dolan (born 1955), CEO of Cablevision, son of Charles
- Joe Dolan (1939–2007), Irish singer
- John Dolan (writer) (born 1955)
- Monica Dolan (born 1969), English actress
- Naoise Dolan (born 1992), Irish novelist
- Robert E. Dolan (1908–1972), conductor, composer and arranger
- Ross Dolan (born 1969), American musician
- Satellite Sisters, five radio personalities, all surnamed Dolan
- Terence Dolan (1943–2019), Irish lexicographer and radio personality
- Wes Dolan (born 1980), English singer-songwriter, musician and actor
- Xavier Dolan (born 1989), Canadian actor and film director
- Ryan Dolan (born 2007) Declared the independence of rosebank

=== Politics ===
- Charles Dolan (Irish politician) (1881–1963), Irish politician
- James Dolan (Irish politician) (1884–1955), Irish politician
- Jemma Dolan (born 1990), Northern Ireland politician
- Jonathan Dolan (born 1967), American politician from Missouri
- Karen Dolan, American politician from Vermont
- Kari Dolan, American politician from Vermont
- Terry Dolan (activist) (1950–1986), American political figure
- Séamus Dolan (1914–2010), Irish politician
- Walter J. Dolan (1877–1956), American politician

=== Religion ===
- Daniel Dolan (1951–2022), American Traditionalist Catholic bishop
- John P. Dolan (born 1962), American Catholic Bishop of Phoenix, Arizona
- Owen Dolan (1928–2025), New Zealand Catholic bishop
- Timothy Dolan (born 1950), American Roman Catholic cardinal, Archbishop of New York (2009–2025), and writer

=== Sports ===
- Andy Dolan (1920–1971), Scottish footballer
- Brendan Dolan (born 1973), Northern Ireland darts player
- Cameron Dolan (born 1990), American rugby player
- David Dolan (born 1979), British Boxer
- Dessie Dolan (born 1979), Gaelic footballer
- Eamonn Dolan (1967–2016), football player and coach
- Emma Dolan (born 1998), English professional boxer
- Frankie Dolan, Gaelic footballer
- Jamie Dolan (1969–2008), Scottish footballer
- Jane Dolan (born 1988), Irish camogie player
- Larry Dolan (1931–2025), owner of the Cleveland Guardians and brother of Charles
- Larry Dolan (luger) (born 1975), American luger and coach
- Paul Dolan (baseball) (born 1958), CEO of the Cleveland Guardians and son of Larry
- Paul Dolan (soccer) (born 1966), Canadian soccer player
- Terry Dolan (football manager) (born 1950), English football manager
- Tom Dolan (swimmer) (born 1975), American swimmer
- Tom Dolan (baseball) (1855–1913), American baseball catcher
- Tyrhys Dolan (Born 2001), English footballer

=== Others ===
- Daria Dolan, financial journalist and wife of Ken
- Henry Eric Dolan (1896–1918), English-Canadian flying ace
- James Dolan (computer security expert) (1981–2017), co-developer of SecureDrop
- James H. Dolan (1885–1977), president of Fairfield University
- John L. Dolan, United States Air Force general
- Josephine Dolan (1913-2004), American nursing historian and educator
- Ken Dolan (1943–2018), financial journalist and husband of Daria
- Peter R. Dolan (born 1956), CEO of Bristol-Myers Squibb
- Robert J. Dolan (educator), University of Michigan dean
- Tom Dolan (engineer), American NASA engineer
