= 2018 deaths in American television =

2018 television

The following deaths of notable individuals related to American television occurred in 2018.

== January ==
Date	Name	Age	Notability	Source
January 1	Jon Paul Steuer	33	Actor best known as the first Quentin Kelly on Grace Under Fire. Also guest spots on Star Trek: The Next Generation, Day by Day, Homefront, and The Wonder Years.	
January 2	Frank Buxton	87	Actor famous for voicing Batfink and Hugo-A-Go-Go on Batfink, writer, director (The Odd Couple, Happy Days, The Oprah Winfrey Show, and Mork & Mindy.)	
January 5	Carole Hart	77	American producer (Free to Be... You and Me)	
January 5	Jerry Van Dyke	86	Actor best known as Luther Van Dam on Coach. Also recurring roles on The Middle, Yes, Dear, You Wish, Teen Angel, 13 Queens Boulevard, Headmaster, Accidental Family, My Mother the Car, and The Dick Van Dyke Show. Brother of Dick Van Dyke.	
January 7	Doug Young	98	American voice actor, best known for voicing Doggie Daddy in Hanna Barbera cartoons	
January 8	Donnelly Rhodes	80	Canadian actor (Bonanza, The Alfred Hitchcock Hour, Laredo, Run for Your Life, Bob Hope Presents the Chrysler Theatre, The Wild Wild West, Mission: Impossible, Insight, The Young and the Restless, Soap, Report to Murphy, Hill Street Blues, Double Trouble, The Heights, Murder, She Wrote, The X-Files, The Outer Limits, Life as We Know It, Battlestar Galactica, Supernatural, The Flash, Legends of Tomorrow)	
January 10	Doreen Tracey	74	Actress and one of the original Mouseketeers on The Mickey Mouse Club	
January 13	Keith Jackson	89	Sportscaster for ABC and ESPN for over 50 years, most notably for college football.	
January 13	Naomi Stevens	92	American actress (recurring roles on Love, American Style, My Three Sons, and The Doris Day Show)	
January 14	Hugh Wilson	74	Writer/director/producer, most notably on WKRP in Cincinnati, Frank's Place, and The Famous Teddy Z	
January 16	Bradford Dillman	87	American actor (Kraft Theatre, Alcoa Premiere, Kraft Suspense Theatre, The Alfred Hitchcock Hour, Dr. Kildare, Court Martial, Shane, Bob Hope Presents the Chrysler Theatre, The Man from U.N.C.L.E., The Big Valley, Judd for the Defense, Ironside, The Virginian, The F.B.I., Mission: Impossible, Medical Center, Cannon, The Wide World of Mystery, Barnaby Jones, King's Crossing, Falcon Crest, Dynasty, Hotel and Murder, She Wrote)	
January 19	Lin Bolen	76	American producer (Stumpers! and W.E.B.) and vice president of daytime television programming for NBC	
January 19	Olivia Cole	75	American actress (Guiding Light, Police Woman, Roots, Szysznyk, Backstairs at the White House, Report to Murphy, North and South, The Women of Brewster Place, Brewster Place, L.A. Law and Murder, She Wrote)	
January 19	John Conboy	83	American producer (Love Is a Many Splendored Thing, The Young and the Restless, Capitol, Santa Barbara and Guiding Light)	
January 19	Dorothy Malone	93	Actress (best known for her role as Constance Mackenzie in Peyton Place and the TV movies Murder in Peyton Place and Peyton Place: The Next Generation).	
January 20	John Coleman	83	Meteorologist (co-founder of The Weather Channel; worked at several local stations including WLS-TV/Chicago and KUSI-TV/San Diego)	
January 21	Connie Sawyer	105	Actress (The Jackie Gleason Show, The Andy Griffith Show, Bonanza, My World and Welcome to It, Room 222, The F.B.I., McMillan & Wife, Mary Hartman, Mary Hartman, The Streets of San Francisco, Kojak, Starsky and Hutch, Hawaii Five-O, Archie Bunker's Place, Hill Street Blues, In the Heat of the Night, Murder, She Wrote, Boy Meets World, Becker, ER and Ray Donovan)	
January 22	Ursula K. Le Guin	88	Science fiction author of The Lathe of Heaven which was adapted into a pair of TV movies, and the Legend of Earthsea series which became the miniseries Earthsea	
January 23	Robert Dowdell	85	Actor (Voyage to the Bottom of the Sea, Stoney Burke)	
January 25	John Morris	91	American composer. Won a Daytime Emmy for his score for the TV miniseries The Tap Dance Kid. Other work includes the themes to The French Chef and Coach.	
January 26	Cyrus Yavneh	75	American producer (CBS Summer Playhouse, Son of the Morning Star, Nothing Sacred, 24, Supernatural and Hit the Floor)	
January 27	Mort Walker	94	American cartoonist, whose King Features Syndicate characters Beetle Bailey and Hi and Lois were later made into animated television series and specials.	
January 30	Mark Salling	35	Actor and musician, best known as Noah 'Puck' Puckerman on Glee	
January 30	Louis Zorich	93	Actor, best known as Burt Buchman on Mad About You and Jules Berger on Brooklyn Bridge	
January 31	Leah LaBelle	31	Singer who competed on the third season of American Idol.	

== February ==
Date	Name	Age	Notability	Source
February 4	John Mahoney	77	Actor, best known as Martin Crane on Frasier (other works include guest spots/recurring roles on Chicago Story, Saturday Night Live, H.E.L.P., The Human Factor, Cheers, 3rd Rock from the Sun, Becker, The Simpsons, In Treatment, Burn Notice and Hot in Cleveland)	
February 7	Mickey Jones	76	American actor (recurring roles on Home Improvement and Justified; guest spots on The Rockford Files, The Dukes of Hazzard, Flo, The Incredible Hulk, T.J. Hooker, V, Alice, The A-Team, All My Children, ALF, Something Is Out There, Baywatch, Step by Step, Northern Exposure, and Boy Meets World)	
February 9	Reg E. Cathey	59	Actor, best known for his roles on Square One Television, and as Freddy Hayes on House of Cards, Norman Wilson on The Wire, Martin Querns on Oz, and Byron Giles on Outcast	
February 9	John Gavin	86	Actor, best known as Harrison Destry on Destry and Dan Talbot on Convoy.	
February 11	Vic Damone	89	American singer, actor and television presenter	
February 11	Jan Maxwell	61	Actress (Recurring roles on Another World, BrainDead, Billy & Billie, The Divide, Gossip Girl, All My Children, One Life to Live, Santa Barbara, and Murder, She Wrote.)	
February 12	Marty Allen	95	American comedian and actor (Kraft Music Hall, The Tonight Show, Tonight Starring Jack Paar, The Garry Moore Show, The Match Game, The Price Is Right, The Hollywood Palace, What's My Line?, Dream Girl of '67, Personality, Della, The Ed Sullivan Show, The Tonight Show Starring Johnny Carson, The Merv Griffin Show, The Dean Martin Show, Tattletales, Dinah!, The Hollywood Squares, The Mike Douglas Show and The Bob Braun Show).	
February 21	Billy Graham	99	American televangelist and prominent figure in 20th century Evangelicalism in the United States	
February 22	Nanette Fabray	97	Emmy Award-winning actress (recurring role on The Mary Tyler Moore Show, guest spots on One Day at a Time, Burke's Law, The Girl from U.N.C.L.E., Love, American Style, Maude, I Dream of Jeannie, Bewitched, Murder, She Wrote, Your Show of Shows, Rowan & Martin's Laugh-In, and Coach); game show personality (The Hollywood Squares, What's My Line?, Password All-Stars, and Match Game); and frequent talk show guest (The Carol Burnett Show and The Ed Sullivan Show)	
February 23	James Colby	56	American actor (As the World Turns, NYPD Blue, Waterfront, Law & Order, Law & Order: Criminal Intent, Law & Order: Special Victims Unit, Blue Bloods, Deception, Taxi Brooklyn, Madoff, Chicago P.D. and Empire)	
February 26	Paul De Meo	64	American writer and producer, co-creator of The Flash, Human Target, Viper and The Sentinel. Recurring on K-Ville and Loving.	
February 26	Benjamin Melniker	104	American producer (Dinosaucers, Swamp Thing: The Series, Fish Police, Swamp Thing, and Where on Earth Is Carmen Sandiego?). Recurring on Sister, Sister, As the World Turns, The Bold and the Beautiful, Days of Our Lives, General Hospital, Guiding Light, The Young and the Restless, and Moesha.	

== March ==
Date	Name	Age	Notability	Source
March 3	David Ogden Stiers	75	American actor, voiceover artist, and musician, best known for portraying Major Charles Emerson Winchester III on M*A*S*H, D.A. Michael Reston in the Perry Mason made-for-TV movies, and recurring roles in Two Guys and a Girl as Mr. Bauer, and Oberoth in Stargate Atlantis, as well as voicing Dr. Jumba Jookiba In Lilo & Stitch: The Series, among his notable credits.	
March 10	Michael Gershman	73	American cinematographer and director (Courthouse, Buffy the Vampire Slayer and Crossing Jordan)	
March 14	Stephen Hawking	76	English theoretical physicist, cosmologist, and author, who played a holographic simulation of himself in an episode of Star Trek: The Next Generation in 1993. The same year, his synthesiser voice was recorded for the Pink Floyd song Keep Talking, and in 1999 for an appearance on The Simpsons, and appeared in the documentary series Stephen Hawking, Master of the Universe, and guest-starred in Futurama and had a recurring role in The Big Bang Theory.	
March 22	Morgana King	87	Singer	
March 23	DuShon Monique Brown	49	Actress, best known as Connie on Chicago Fire and Katie Welch on Prison Break	
March 23	Debbie Lee Carrington	58	Actress	

== April ==
Date	Name	Age	Notability	Source
April 1	Steven Bochco	74	Writer and producer (creator of Hill Street Blues, L.A. Law, NYPD Blue and Doogie Howser, M.D.)	
April 1	Bob Beattie	85	Skiing coach and commentator for ABC and ESPN	
April 2	Susan Anspach	75	American actress (The Defenders, The Patty Duke Show, The Nurses, McMillan & Wife, The Yellow Rose, Space, The Slap Maxwell Story, Empty Nest, Murder, She Wrote and Cagney & Lacey: The Return)	
April 4	Soon-Tek Oh	85	Korean–American actor best known for the voice of Fa Zhou in Disney's Mulan and the direct-to-video sequel Mulan II and the sadistic Colonel Yin in Missing in Action 2: The Beginning. He has starred in many films, and also acted in television series, including Stargate SG-1, MacGyver, M*A*S*H, Charlie's Angels, Airwolf, Magnum, P.I., Hawaii Five-O, Kung-Fu, Zorro, Baa Baa Black Sheep and Touched by an Angel.	
April 8	Chuck McCann	83	American voice actor (DuckTales, G.I. Joe: A Real American Hero) and commercial voiceover artist (Right Guard deodorant, Cocoa Puffs mascot Sonny the Cuckoo Bird). Also host of several local children's shows and guest spots on several sitcoms.	
April 13	Art Bell	72	American broadcaster and author	
April 15	Philip D'Antoni	89	American producer (This Proud Land and Movin' On)	
April 15	R. Lee Ermey	74	Actor, voice actor, TV host, and United States Marine Corps drill instructor (TV work includes hosting Mail Call, Lock n' Load with R. Lee Ermey, and GunnyTime; and guest spots on House, SpongeBob SquarePants, and Rocket Power)	
April 16	Harry Anderson	65	Actor best known as Judge Harry T. Stone on Night Court and Dave Barry on Dave's World. Also had a main role in the miniseries It, a brief recurring role on Cheers, and hosted Saturday Night Live several times.	
April 16	Pamela Gidley	52	Actress and model (recurring roles on Tour of Duty, Strange Luck, The Pretender, Angel Street, Skin, and CSI: Crime Scene Investigation; and appearances in the TV movies Twin Peaks: Fire Walk with Me, Glory Days, Blue Bayou, Man Made, and Goodbye Casanova)	
April 17	Ken Dolan	75	American financial advisor who along with wife Daria Dolan formed the double act The Dolans (hosts of Dolans Unscripted on CNN and contributors to CBS This Morning)	
April 18	Bruno Sammartino	82	WWE Hall of Fame professional wrestler	
April 20	Al Swift	82	Politician and Emmy Award-winning TV news producer at KVOS-TV/Bellingham, Washington	
April 21	Verne Troyer	49	American actor, comedian, YouTuber and stunt performer	
April 22	Dave Nelson	73	Retired baseball player and coach. TV color commentator/analyst for the Milwaukee Brewers and Kansas City Royals.	
April 23	Don Bustany	89	Camera coordinator on The Mary Tyler Moore Show, The Bob Newhart Show, and other MTM productions; co-creator of America's Top 10	
April 23	Bob Dorough	94	Musician who wrote and performed the music on Schoolhouse Rock!	
April 27	Paul Junger Witt	77	Co-founder of Witt/Thomas Productions and film and television producer of such works as Here Come the Brides, The Partridge Family, The Golden Girls, Soap, Benson, Empty Nest and Blossom.	
April 29	Robert Mandan	86	American actor, notable for playing Chester Tate on Soap, James Bradford in Three's A Crowd, and Col. Lawrence Fielding on Private Benjamin. Guest roles in The Facts of Life, Who's the Boss?, All in the Family, Maude, Sanford and Son, Married... with Children, and Star Trek: Deep Space Nine.	

== May ==
Date	Name	Age	Notability	Source
May 6	Ray Szmanda	91	Announcer on Menards commercials from 1976 to 1998	
May 13	Margot Kidder	69	Canadian-born American Emmy Award-winning actress and activist best known as Lois Lane in the 1970s-1980s Superman films (TV work includes a regular role in Nichols, panelist on Mantrap, guest spots on Harry O, Banacek, Saturday Night Live, The L Word, Brothers and Sisters, Smallville, and R.L. Stine's The Haunting Hour; TV movie work includes Pygmalion, Body of Evidence and WindRunner)	
May 14	Tom Wolfe	88	American author and journalist widely known for his association with New Journalism, a style of news writing and journalism developed in the 1960s and 1970s that incorporated literary techniques. His first novel, The Bonfire of the Vanities, published in 1987, was met with critical acclaim and also became a commercial success. It was adapted as a major motion picture of the same name directed by Brian De Palma. In 1977, PBS produced Tom Wolfe's Los Angeles, a fictional, satirical TV movie set in Los Angeles. Wolfe appears in the movie as himself.	
May 16	Joseph Campanella	93	Actor best known as Jonathan Young on The Bold and the Beautiful, and recurring roles on The Bold Ones: The Lawyers, The Doctors and the Nurses, Mannix, One Day at a Time, The Colbys, Road Rovers, That's Life, and Spider-Man	
May 16	Hugh Dane	75	American character actor	
May 20	Patricia Morison	103	Actress and singer (TV work includes a recurring role as Dr. Karen Gayle on The Cases of Eddie Drake and guest spots on Cheers and Have Gun – Will Travel)	
May 21	Allyn Ann McLerie	91	Canadian-born American actress and dancer (regular role in The Days and Nights of Molly Dodd and The Tony Randall Show; recurring roles in WKRP in Cincinnati and Punky Brewster; guest roles include The Love Boat, The Thorn Birds, St. Elsewhere, Barney Miller, Dynasty, The Waltons and Brooklyn Bridge)	
May 21	Clint Walker	90	Actor, best known as Cheyenne Bodie on Cheyenne	
May 22	Elizabeth Sung	63	Actress, best known as Luan Volien from The Young and the Restless; guest appearances include Hawaii Five-0, The Sopranos, Bones, and Curb Your Enthusiasm	
May 24	Jerry Maren	98	Actor, best known as a member of the Munchkin Lollipop Guild in the frequently televised film The Wizard of Oz; was a regular cast member on No Soap, Radio and The Gong Show, in addition to guest appearances on The Odd Couple and Seinfeld	

== June ==
Date	Name	Age	Notability	Source
June 1	William Edward Phipps	96	American actor and producer perhaps best known for his roles in dozens of classic sci-fi and westerns, both in films and on television.	
June 5	Kate Spade	55	American fashion designer, sister-in-law of David Spade, and aunt of Rachel Brosnahan (appearances include Today and The View).	
June 8	Anthony Bourdain	61	Chef, four-time Emmy winning-television host (A Cook's Tour, The Layover, Anthony Bourdain: No Reservations, and Anthony Bourdain: Parts Unknown) and writer (Treme). Guest appearances include Miami Ink, The Simpsons and Yo Gabba Gabba!.	
June 9	Murray Fromson	88	Correspondent on CBS News	
June 10	Neal E. Boyd	42	Opera singer and winner of America's Got Talent season three.	
June 11	Rumen Petkov	70	Animator and director (Aaahh!!! Real Monsters, Johnny Bravo, Dexter's Laboratory, Cow and Chicken, I Am Weasel, The New Woody Woodpecker Show, The Powerpuff Girls, Duckman, Mike, Lu & Og)	
June 12	Al Meltzer	89	Sports anchor at WCAU in Philadelphia	
June 15	Joe DeNardo	87	American meteorologist, philanthropist, and lifetime Emmy recipient, notable for his work at WTAE-TV Pittsburgh from 1969 to 2007, as well as an early tenure with KDKA-TV	
June 17	Elizabeth Brackett	76	Journalist (correspondent on PBS NewsHour and host of Chicago Tonight on WTTW)	
June 18	Big Van Vader	63	Former professional wrestler	
June 18	Richard Valeriani	85	Correspondent for NBC News	
June 21	Charles Krauthammer	68	Pulitzer Prize–winning columnist (The Washington Post) and pundit (Fox News)	
June 22	Deanna Lund	81	American actress and author, notable for playing Valerie Scott in Land of The Giants and Peggy Lowell on General Hospital	
June 24	Stanley Anderson	78	American actor (Son of the Morning Star, L.A. Law, Dangerous Minds, The Shining, Players, Seinfeld, The X-Files, Ally McBeal, Crossing Jordan, Roswell, Law & Order, American Dreams, The Practice, The Drew Carey Show and NYPD Blue)	
June 24	Richard Benjamin Harrison	77	American pawn shop owner and reality television personality ("Old Man" on Pawn Stars)	
June 28	Harlan Ellison	84	Writer (The Flying Nun, Burke's Law, Route 66, The Outer Limits, Star Trek, The Man from U.N.C.L.E., Cimarron Strip, and The Alfred Hitchcock Hour).	
June 29	Matt Cappotelli	38	American professional wrestler, Co-winner of the third season of WWE Tough Enough.	
June 29	Steve Ditko	90	Writer/artist for Marvel Comics who co-created the characters Spider-Man (star of two live action and eight animated television series) and Doctor Strange (most prominently featured in a 1978 TV movie)	

== July ==
Date	Name	Age	Notability	Source
July 1	Dick Feagler	79	News commentator at Cleveland stations WVIX, WKYC and WEWS-TV.	
July 5	Ed Schultz	64	Political commentator and host of The Ed Show and News with Ed Schultz	
July 8	Tab Hunter	86	Actor (star of The Tab Hunter Show, guest spots on Hawaii Five-O, The Love Boat and The Six Million Dollar Man)	
July 8	Alan Johnson	81	Choreographer, three time Emmy Award-winner (Irving Berlin's 100th Birthday Celebration, Shirley MacLaine... 'Every Little Movement, and S Wonderful, 'S Marvelous, 'S Gershwin)	
July 12	Roger Perry	85	American actor (December Bride, Harrigan and Son, Arrest and Trial, Nanny and the Professor, Walt Disney's Wonderful World of Color, Love, American Style, Ironside, The F.B.I., Barnaby Jones, The Facts of Life and Falcon Crest)	
July 17	Dennis W. Day	76	Mousketeer on The Mickey Mouse Club	
July 18	Adrian Cronauer	79	American radio and television personality and voice over talent who was immortalized by Robin Williams in the 1987 film adaptation of his autobiography Good Morning, Vietnam (alumnus of WRFT Roanoke, Virginia; commercial work included Lipton, Columbia Records and Welch's)	
July 19	Jon Schnepp	51	Animator, director, producer, writer, and voice actor, best known for his work on Metalocalypse, Space Ghost Coast to Coast, and Aqua Teen Hunger Force	
July 21	Elmarie Wendel	89	Actress best known as Mamie Dubcek on 3rd Rock from the Sun and Gina on George Lopez. Guest spots on Love & War, Seinfeld, General Hospital, Bewitched, Murphy Brown, and Empty Nest.	
July 25	Frank Clarke	84	Retired football player and sportscaster (NFL on CBS, WFAA-TV/Dallas, Texas)	
July 25	Patrick Williams	79	Four-time Emmy-winning composer (The Days and Nights of Molly Dodd, The Streets of San Francisco, The Mary Tyler Moore Show)	
July 29	Nikolai Volkoff	70	WWE Hall of Fame professional wrestler	

== August ==
Date	Name	Age	Notability	Source
August 2	Neil Argo	71	Composer (Wild America, Mission: Impossible, Dynasty, The Colbys, MacGyver, and Beverly Hills, 90210).	
August 5	Gerry Lenfest	88	Lawyer and executive (chairman and majority shareholder of TelVue)	
August 5	Charlotte Rae	92	American character actress, singer, and dancer, best known as Edna Garrett in the sitcoms Diff'rent Strokes and its spin-off, The Facts of Life, as well as a regular role as Mrs. Bellotti in Hot l Baltimore and a cast member of The Rich Little Show and recurring roles as Molly the Mail Lady on Sesame Street and Sylvia Schnauzer on Car 54, Where Are You?.	
August 6	Patricia Benoit	91	Actress (The Philco Television Playhouse, Mister Peepers, Producers' Showcase, The Alcoa Hour, The United States Steel Hour and As the World Turns)	
August 8	John Glines	84	Producer and writer (Sesame Street and Captain Kangaroo)	
August 13	Jim Neidhart	63	Legendary professional wrestler; brother-in-law of WWE Hall of Famer Bret Hart	
August 20	Craig Zadan	69	Producer (Gypsy, Serving in Silence: The Margarethe Cammermeyer Story, Twists of Terror, Double Platinum, The Wonderful World of Disney, The Beach Boys: An American Family, The Three Stooges, What Makes a Family, Brian's Song, Life with Judy Garland: Me and My Shadows, Martin and Lewis, The Music Man, Lucy, The Reagans, Veritas: The Quest, Suburban Madness, It's All Relative, Empire, Wedding Wars, A Raisin in the Sun, Living Proof, Smash, Blue Lagoon: The Awakening, Steel Magnolias, Drop Dead Diva, The Anna Nicole Story and Bonnie & Clyde)	
August 21	Stefan Karl Stefansson	43	Icelandic actor best known as the villain Robbie Rotten on LazyTown.	
August 23	Brian Drebber	68	Sportscaster (Speed, TNT, ESPN, ABC, CBS, and PBS)	
August 23	Russ Heath	91	Artist (Godzilla, Blackstar, G.I. Joe: A Real American Hero, RoboCop: The Animated Series, The Karate Kid, X-Men: Pryde of the X-Men and G.I. Joe: A Real American Hero (1989 TV series))	
August 24	Robin Leach	76	British writer and TV personality, best known as the longtime host of Lifestyles of the Rich and Famous. Also host of Fame, Fortune and Romance, The Surreal Life: Fame Games and Madonna Exposed; contributor for People Tonight, AM Los Angeles, and Entertainment Tonight; co-founder of Food Network; and a guest appearance in WrestleMania IV.	
August 25	Neil Simon	91	Playwright, wrote The Odd Couple on which three TV series (the original 1970–1975 version, a 1982–1983 remake, and a 2015–2017 update) are based. Also screenwriter (Your Show of Shows, The Phil Silvers Show, Laughter on the 23rd Floor)	
August 25	John McCain	81	Politician, who guest starred in shows like Parks and Recreation.	
August 26	Barrie Dunsmore	79	Senior foreign/diplomatic correspondent for ABC News	
August 27	Fredd Wayne	93	Actor best known for his Benjamin Franklin impression and one man show Benjamin Franklin, Citizen	
August 29	Stan Brock	82	English-American wilderness expert and founder of Remote Area Medical (TV work includes Mutual of Omaha's Wild Kingdom)	
August 30	Vanessa Marquez	49	Actress primarily known for her recurring role on the first three seasons of ER as nurse Wendy Goldman; also recurred on Malcolm And Eddie	
August 31	Susan Brown	86	Actress best known for soap opera roles, including Santa Barbara, Port Charles, As the World Turns, The Bold and the Beautiful, Days of Our Lives, General Hospital, Guiding Light, and The Young and the Restless. Also guest spots on Death Valley Days, Kojak, Marcus Welby, M.D., Barney Miller, Hotel, Beverly Hills, 90210, and Frasier.	
August 31	Gloria Jean	92	Actress and singer (Rebound, Death Valley Days, The Colgate Comedy Hour, Your Favorite Story, Annie Oakley, Lux Video Theatre, Lock-Up, The Dick Powell Theatre and Saints and Sinners)	
August 31	Carole Shelley	79	British-born American actress (In Living Color, Rheingold Theatre, The Avengers, The Odd Couple, Another World, As the World Turns, The Bold and the Beautiful, Days of Our Lives, Loving, All My Children, One Life to Live, Santa Barbara, General Hospital, Guiding Light, The Young and the Restless, Charlie's Angels, Spenser: For Hire, I Dream of Jeannie, The Cosby Show, Monsters, Hercules, Bewitched, Chicago Fire, Law & Order: Special Victims Unit, Frasier, All That, and Third Watch)	

== September ==
Date	Name	Age	Notability	Source
September 4	Bill Daily	91	Actor known for guest playing Mr. Johnson on Bewitched, Roger Healey on I Dream of Jeannie, Howard Borden on The Bob Newhart Show, and Dr. Larry Dykstra on ALF. Frequent panelist on Match Game.	
September 4	Christopher Lawford	63	Actor (All My Children, One Life to Live, and General Hospital)	
September 4	Thomas Rickman	78	Writer and director (wrote several TV movies including The Hands of Cormac Joyce, Home Cookin, Bethune, Truman, Tuesdays with Morrie, A Mother's Fight for Justice, The Reagans, Front of the Class and A Smile as Big as the Moon).	
September 5	Mike Hogewood	65	Sportscaster (Fox Sports South, Raycom Sports, Sun Sports, NESN, Comcast SportsNet, HDNet, Speed, TNN, and WFMY-TV/Greensboro, North Carolina)	
September 6	Thad Mumford	67	Writer/producer known for work on The Electric Company, M*A*S*H, and ALF	
September 6	Burt Reynolds	82	Actor (main/recurring roles on Gunsmoke, Evening Shade, Out of This World, Hawk, Dan August, and B.L. Stryker); appeared as himself on The Golden Girls, Beverly Hills, 90210, The Larry Sanders Show, Cybill, and Archer; frequent guest host of The Tonight Show Starring Johnny Carson and guest star on Designing Women and My Name Is Earl	
September 7	Mac Miller	26	Rapper, reality television star (Mac Miller and the Most Dope Family). Performed on Late Night with Jimmy Fallon, Today, The Late Show with Stephen Colbert, and The Nightly Show with Larry Wilmore	
September 10	Peter Donat	90	Canadian-American actor (Kraft Television Theatre, Hawk, Mission: Impossible, I Spy, The Waltons, Mannix, Great Performances, Captains and the Kings, Rich Man, Poor Man Book II, Dallas, Flamingo Road, Walt Disney's Wonderful World of Color, Murder, She Wrote, Time Trax, The Outer Limits and The X-Files)	
September 13	Marin Mazzie	57	Actress and singer (recurring role as Kathy Halverson on Still Standing).	
September 16	Frank Parker	79	Actor best known as Grandpa Shawn Brady on Days of Our Lives	
September 23	Gary Kurtz	78	Film/TV producer best known for his work on the original Star Wars trilogy (TV work includes Friends and Heroes, 5-25-77, The Tale of Jack Frost, and The Making of Star Wars)	
September 25	Jerry Thorpe	92	American director and producer (December Bride, The Walter Winchell File, The Lucy-Desi Comedy Hour, Westinghouse Desilu Playhouse, Kraft Mystery Theater, Kung Fu, Harry O, The MacKenzies of Paradise Cove, Chicago Story, Our House, One West Waikiki, The Untouchables, Vacation Playhouse, Rafferty, American Dream, The Devlin Connection and Falcon Crest)	
September 26	Roger Robinson	78	American actor (Ironside, Starsky and Hutch, Kojak, Baretta, King, Quincy M.E., Friends, The Jeffersons, The Incredible Hulk, The Dukes of Hazzard, Kate Brasher, ER, NYPD Blue, Rubicon, Elementary and How to Get Away with Murder)	

== October ==
Date	Name	Age	Notability	Source
October 4	Will Vinton	70	American producer and writer (Gary & Mike, The PJs, The California Raisin Show, A Claymation Christmas Celebration, Adventures in Wonderland, Sesame Street, guest starring on Guiding Light and Transformers: Rescue Bots)	
October 6	Paul James	87	Sportscaster/sports director at Salt Lake City stations KSL-TV and KTVX	
October 6	Don Sandburg	87	American actor and producer (The Bozo Show and The Banana Splits)	
October 6	Scott Wilson	76	Actor best known as Hershel Greene on The Walking Dead. Also recurring roles on CSI: Crime Scene Investigation, Bosch, Damien, and The OA	
October 7	Peggy McCay	90	Actress best known as Caroline Brady on Days of Our Lives	
October 7	Celeste Yarnall	74	Character actor (guest spots on The Adventures of Ozzie & Harriet, My Three Sons, The Man from U.N.C.L.E., Star Trek, It Takes a Thief, Hogan's Heroes, Land of the Giants, and Star Trek: Of Gods and Men)	
October 8	Arnold Kopelson	83	Film/TV producer (TV work includes executive producing the shows The Fugitive and Thieves, and the TV movies Frogmen and Past Tense). Also served on the board of directors for the CBS Corporation.	
October 9	Warner Saunders	83	News anchor at Chicago stations WMAQ-TV and WBBM-TV	
October 11	Carol Hall	82	Film/TV composer (Sesame Street and several TV movies and specials)	
October 15	Paul Allen	65	Businessman, philanthropist and investor (co-founder of Vulcan Productions)	
October 16	Dennis Hof	73	Brothel owner and star of Cathouse: The Series	
October 16	Sid Michaels Kavulich	62	Politician and former sportscaster at WBRE-TV/Wilkes-Barre, Pennsylvania	
October 18	Danny Leiner	57	Film/TV director (Backwash, The Mind of the Married Man)	
October 24	James Karen	94	American actor, voice over talent and commercial pitchman, notable for serving as the spokesperson for Pathmark, daytime roles as Dr. Burke on As the World Turns and the original Lincoln Tyler on All My Children, a recurrent role as Eliot Randolph in Eight is Enough, a memorable role as the pro-KKK businessman who was saved by George Jefferson via CPR in The Jeffersons, and ruthless businessman Nathan Lassiter in Little House: The Last Farewell, among his credits.	
October 30	Beverly McClellan	49	Singer who appeared on the first season of The Voice	
October 30	Doug Rafferty	66	Former newscaster at WTTV Indianapolis, Indiana and WGME Portland, Maine	

== November ==
Date	Name	Age	Notability	Source
November 3	Sondra Locke	74	American actress and director (Night Gallery, The F.B.I., The ABC Afternoon Playbreak, Gondola , Kung Fu, Planet of the Apes, Barnaby Jones, Cannon, Friendships, Secrets and Lies, Rosie: The Rosemary Clooney Story, Tales of the Unexpected and Amazing Stories)	
November 4	Mike Parker	75	News anchor/reporter at WBBM-TV/Chicago and KNXT-TV/Los Angeles	
November 5	Kitty O'Neil	72	American stunt-woman, coordinator, and consultant (credits include The Bionic Woman and Wonder Woman, of which she set a women's high-fall record of 127 feet (39 m) at the Valley Hilton in Sherman Oaks, California, later breaking the record with a 180-foot (55 m) fall from a helicopter while filming.) She was also portrayed by Stockard Channing in the biographical TV movie Silent Victory: The Kitty O'Neil Story	
November 12	Stan Lee	95	American comic book writer, best known as co-creator of Spider-Man, Hulk, Doctor Strange, Fantastic Four, The X-Men, Ant-Man, Iron Man, Thor, Daredevil, Black Panther, and many other Marvel Comics properties, many of which were adapted into television series in which Lee made cameos	
November 13	Katherine MacGregor	93	American actress, notable for portraying Harriet Oleson on Little House On The Prairie	
November 15	Roy Clark	85	American country musician, best known for co-hosting Hee Haw throughout its run (other TV work includes The Beverly Hillbillies, The Jimmy Dean Show, and numerous guest appearances)	
November 16	William Goldman	87	Writer (Mr. Horn, City in Fear)	
November 17	Mary Kay Stearns	93	Creator, writer and co-star of the first made-for-TV sitcom, Mary Kay and Johnny	
November 21	Michele Carey	75	American actress (Wendy and Me, The Wild Wild West, Gunsmoke, Starsky and Hutch and A Man Called Sloane)	
November 23	Wayne Maunder	80	Canadian-born American actor, notable for playing George Armstrong Custer in Custer, Scott Lancer in Lancer, and Sergeant Sam MacCray in Chase	
November 24	Ricky Jay	72	Magician and actor (recurring roles on Deadwood, The Unit, and Kidnapped). Also the only magician ever profiled on American Masters.	
November 26	Stephen Hillenburg	57	Cartoonist, animator, producer, and teacher, best known as the creator of SpongeBob SquarePants and the director of Rocko's Modern Life	
November 30	Kuma von Clifford	16	Canine actor (Dog with a Blog, Mutt & Stuff)	
November 30	George H. W. Bush	94	41st President of the United States	

== December ==
Date	Name	Age	Notability	Source
December 1	Ken Berry	85	American actor, singer, dancer, and personality, notable for his roles as Dr. Kapish on Dr. Kildare, Joe Dalrymple on No Time for Sergeants, Captain Parmenter on F Troop, Sam Jones on The Andy Griffith Show and Mayberry R.F.D., a recurrent member of The Carol Burnett Show, the host of his own variety series, and Vinton Harper on Mama's Family; commercial work for Kinney Shoes.	
December 2	Paul Sherwen	62	English racing cyclist and sportscaster (NBC)	
December 3	Philip Bosco	88	Actor (recurring roles on Damages, Law & Order, Law & Order: Special Victims Unit, TriBeCa, and Liberty! The American Revolution) and voice-over narrator (The Civil War, Freedom: A History of Us, and American Experience)	
December 4	Sam Nover	77	American sportscaster/sports director at WPXI/Pittsburgh from 1970 to 2001 and play-by-play announcer for the Pittsburgh Penguins and Pittsburgh Steelers. Also worked for NBC Sports and WKBD-TV/Detroit.	
December 5	Thomas Billington	60	British professional wrestler; better known as the Dynamite Kid	
December 6	Larry Hennig	82	Professional wrestler. Father of Curt Hennig and grandfather of Curtis Axel.	
December 6	Tim Rossovich	72	American football linebacker and actor (Charlie's Angels, When the Whistle Blows, Fantasy Island, Matt Houston, Hart to Hart, The A-Team, All My Children, Automan, Brothers, Knight Rider, Riptide, The Love Boat, The Fall Guy, Perfect Strangers, Mickey Spillane's Mike Hammer, Magnum, P.I., Hunter, MacGyver, Jake and the Fatman, Baywatch)	
December 7	Charles Weldon	78	American actor (Police Story, The Streets of San Francisco, Kojak, Sanford and Son, A Woman Called Moses, The Rockford Files, Roots: The Next Generations, Hill Street Blues, Gimme a Break!, The Atlanta Child Murders, St. Elsewhere, New York Undercover, Law & Order)	
December 9	Rodney Kageyama	77	American actor	
December 10	Alvin Epstein	93	American actor	
December 13	Don Webster	79	Longtime personality at WEWS-TV/Cleveland	
December 13	Nancy Wilson	81	American singer and actress (Burke's Law, I Spy, Room 222, Hawaii Five-O, O'Hara, U.S. Treasury, Search, The F.B.I., Police Story, It's a Living, The Cosby Show, The Sinbad Show, The Parent 'Hood)	
December 17	Penny Marshall	75	Actress best known as Laverne DeFazio on Laverne & Shirley. Also film director and producer. Sister of Garry Marshall, mother of Tracy Reiner, and aunt of Scott Marshall.	
December 19	Norman Gimbel	91	American lyricist; known for writing the lyrics for the theme songs for Happy Days, Laverne & Shirley, Angie and Wonder Woman	
December 24	Jerry Riopelle	77	American singer-songwriter, musician and record producer (composed music for the TV movies Evil Roy Slade, Rolling Man, The Bounty Man and Cops)	
December 26	Sister Wendy Beckett	88	British nun, art historian, and television presenter on the BBC and PBS.	
December 26	Herb Ellis	97	American actor (Dragnet, Lux Video Theatre, The Walter Winchell File, The D.A.'s Man, Alfred Hitchcock Presents, M Squad, Peter Gunn, Peter Loves Mary, The Andy Griffith Show, Hennesey, The Many Loves of Dobie Gillis, Bewitched, Dragnet 1967)	
December 29	Sanford Gibbons	85	American actor and media personality (Petrocelli, Little House on the Prairie, Father Murphy, The Young Riders)	
December 29	Robert Ruth	82	American actor (Green Acres, Mannix, The Magician, Veronica Clare, Frasier, Everybody Loves Raymond)	
December 30	Don Lusk	105	American animator (TV work includes The Smurfs, A Pup Named Scooby-Doo and ten Charlie Brown television specials)	

== See also ==
- 2018 in American television
- Deaths in 2018
