= Fearghal Ó Gadhra =

Irish lord, 17th century

Fearghal Ó Gadhra (c. 1597 – after 1660), sometimes referred to as Farrell O'Gara, was lord of Coolavin, and patron of the Annals of the Four Masters.

== Family background ==
Ó Gadhra was the son of Tadhg mac Oilill Ó Gadhra of Coolavin, located in what is now south County Sligo. The family were ancient proprietors in Connacht; Geoffrey Keating gives their ancestry as follows:

"Tadhg son of Cian, son of Oilill Olom, had two sons, namely, Connla and Cormac Gaileang. From Iomchaidh son of Connla comes O Cearbhaill, and from Fionnachta son of Connla comes O Meachair. From Cormac Gaileang son of Tadhg, son of Cian, comes O Eadhra and O Gadhra and O Conchubhair Ciannachta. The following are the territories they acquired, namely: Gaileanga, east and west; Ciannachta, south and north; Luighne, east and west."

In the 12th century the Ó Gadhras were Kings of Sliabh Lugha, anciently referred to as Gailenga. The O'Hara's retained the name Luighne for their territory to the north. The O'Garas were expelled into Coolavin, Co. Sligo, by the Mac Jordan of Connacht.

== Early life ==
Sir Theobald Dillon, an Anglo-Irish property holder in Luighne, was awarded the wardship of Ó Gadhra by King James I which required Dillon to provide for Ó Gadhra's attendance at Trinity College Dublin between 1609 and 1616. Despite the 1589 rebellion of his father, Iriell O'Gara, Fearghal inherited most of his estate, thanks to the protection of Dillon, and in the 1630s was one of the wealthiest Catholic landowners in the county. In 1618, either Gadhra or Dillon surrendered the estate at Moygara to King James I and received the land back on English Tenure, who in turn granted Gadhra the power to hold court and act as a baron. In 1634 he became MP for Sligo. He married Isobel Taffe, daughter of Sir John, Viscount Corran, who was married to a daughter of Sir Theobald Dillon. Though Dillon was Protestant, Ó Gadhra and his immediate family appear to have remained committed Catholics.

Fearghal and Isobel had sons, Cian and John. A descendant, Oliver O'Gara, served in the army of James II during the Williamite War in Ireland.

== Irish Rebellion of 1641 ==
Ó Gadhra welcomed the arrival of Owen Roe O'Neill in 1642, and his son John served as a captain in the Confederate forces. In 1643, Ó Gadhra was accused of being an Irish rebel by Andrew Adaire, who claimed Ó Gadhra was among the Irish rebels in County Sligo in 1641. In 1644, a Protestant refugee named Jane Browne testified that Ó Gadhra had shielded, fed, and clothed her and her children following the fall of the Protestant stronghold at Templehouse Castle in 1641.

== Final Years ==
Following the Cromwellian conquest of Ireland, Ó Gadhra's property was seized. He was alive as late as 1660, though the precise date of his death is uncertain.

== Patron to the Four Masters ==
Ó Gadhra's contribution to Irish history and culture is as patron of the Annals of the Four Masters in the 1630s. Scholars still scrutinise the motives behind the Franciscan order who chose "this politically minor lord ... as the patron of the most important annalistic collection of early modern Ireland ... A common explanation for Ó Gadhra's engagement ... is that his attendance at TCD brought him into contact with the antiquarian scholars James Ussher and James Ware, who, it is suggested, communicated their interest in collecting Irish literary and manuscript material to the young man. This is a plausible surmise but it is weakened by the lack of any evidence of Ó Gadhra's presence at Trinity. A more likely scenario is that the link between Ó Gadhra and Mícheál Ó Cléirigh originated with the family of Ó Gadhra guardian. The Dillons had strong connections with the Franciscan order and in particular with monasteries associated with Ó Cléirigh. One of Dillion's sons, Edward (Father Louis), held the position of novice master in the Irish college at Louvain in the 1620s, when Ó Cléirigh was also there." (2010, p. 481).

Other reasons included common sentiments with other Catholic patrons of the order's scholars. Also, Ó Gadhra was relatively wealthy and a respected member of the Catholic gentry of north Connacht.

In appreciation of his support, he was presented with a copy of the manuscript, which included a lengthy acknowledgement of his efforts, by Ó Cléirigh. This manuscript was inherited by Ó Gadhra's sons, and taken to the continent by Colonel Oliver O'Gara, in his exile following the Treaty of Limerick. In the 1730s, O'Gara returned it Ireland, it been entrusted to Charles O'Conor (historian) of Belangare. It is currently in the Royal Irish Academy, as MS C iii3 and H 2 ii.

=== Ó Gadhra's in the annals ===
- 926 - Eaghra mac Poprigh, lord of Luighne Connacht.
- 964 - Toichleach ua n-Gadhra was tighearna of Luighne Deisceirt.
- 993 - Conghalach mac Laidhgnen, .i. ua Gadhra, tigherna Gaileng.
- 1181 - Donn Sléibhe Ua Gadhra, king of Sleibe Lughu, died.
- 1206 - Ruairí Ó Gadhra, Lord of Sliabh Lugha, died.
- 1227 - Donn Sleibhe O Gadhra, Lord of Sliabh Lugha, was slain by Gillaroe, his own brother's son.
- 1256 - Rory O Gadhra, Lord of Sliabh Lugha, was slain by David, son of Richard Cuisin.
- 1285 - Rory O Gadhra, Lord of Sliabh-Lugha, was slain by Mac Feorais on Lough O'Gara.

== See also ==
- Ferghal Dubh Ó Gadhra, compiler of the O Gara Manuscript
