= Eaghra Poprigh mac Saorghus =

Eaghra Poprigh mac Saorghus (died 926) was eponym and ancestor of the clan Ó hEaghra, King of Luighne Connacht.

== Ancestry ==
Eaghra Poprigh mac Saorghus was a member of the Gailenga people of north Connacht. They were originally from the kingdom of Brega on the east coast of Ireland. Dubhaltach Mac Fhirbhisigh (665.5., pp. 654–665) gives his pedigree as:

- Eaghra Paiprigh, from whom are Ui Eaghra, s. Saorghus s. Béac s. Flaithgheas, from whom are Clann Flaithgheasa, s. Taichleach (aforementioned) s. Ceann Faoladh s. Diarmuid s. Fionnbharr s. Bréanainn s. Nad Fraoich s. Fidhsheang (or Finnéan, or Idhéan, or Fidhean, or Iodhan) s. Fiodhchuire, from whom are Ui Fhiodhchuire, s. Airtchearb s. Nia Corb s. Loí, from whom are Luighne, s. Cormac Gaileang s. Tadhg.

The last name is that of Tadhg mac Cian, described at 660.6 (pp. 646–647) as the son of Cian, son of Ailill Aulom. Cian is given as the son of Sadhbh inion Conn Cétchathach (661.1, pp. 646–647). At 660.4 on the same pages is written:

- It is the family of Cian which is announced openly here according to the old books which begin thus below: The families of Éibhear in Leath Chuinn: eastern and western Gaileanga, southern and northern Cianachta, eastern and western Luighne, and the four (or seven) Dealbhna, i.e., Dealbhna Mhór and Dealbhna Bheag in Midhe and Dealbhna of Eathair in western Midhe, and Dealbhna of Tír Dhá Loch in Connacht.

Members of the family feature in the Old Irish tale, Battle of Maigh Mucruimhe, in which Cian and his six brothers were killed in the battle.

== Annalistic references ==
The Annals of the Four Masters, sub anno 926, state "Eaghra, son of Poprigh, lord of Luighne, in Connaught; ... died."

== Descendants ==
At 665.5 and 666.2, Mac Fhirbhisigh names his sons as Muirgheas and Maghnus. Muirgheas's descendants are given down to the brothers, Murchadh and Aodh Ua hEaghra (King of Luighne in 1155). Maghnus's descendants are brought down to Tadhg and Cian mac Tadhg mac Cormac Ó hEaghra, and their first cousins, Oilill, Brian and Cormac Óg mac Cormac Óg mac Cormac Ó hEaghra, these five men being alive in 1664.

Other descendants would include:

- Charles O'Hara, 1st Baron Tyrawley, died 1724, father of
- James O'Hara, 2nd Baron Tyrawley, 1682–1774, father of
- Charles O'Hara, 1740–1802, surrendered the British army at the Siege of Yorktown 1781.
- Robert O'Hara Burke, 1820–1861, leader of the ill-fated Burke and Wills expedition.

== Family tree ==
  Ailill Aulom
 =Sadhbh inion Conn Céadchathach
  |
  |
  Cian & six brothers
  |
  |
  Tadhg
  |
 (thirteen generations)
  |
  Saorghus mac Béac
  |
  |___________________________________________________________________________________________________
  |                                                                                                  |
  |                                                                                                  |
  Eaghra Poprigh, died 926.                                                                      Sleiteachán
  |                                                                                                  |
  |________________________________________________________                                          |
  |                               |                       |                                        Gadhra
  |                               |                       |                                          |          
  Muirgheas mac Eaghra            Maghnus mac Eaghra      Muirchertach mac Eaghra, d. 928.           |
  |                               |                                                         Domhnall mac Gadhra                     
  |                               |                                                       king of Luighne Connacht, d. 931
  Murchadh ua hEaghra             Domhnall Mor ua hEaghra                                             |          
  |                               |                                                                   |
  |                               |                                                             Clann Ó Gadhra
  Domhnall Ua hEaghra, d.1023     Muircheartach Ua hEaghra
  |                               |
  |                               |
  Murchadh                        Taithleach Urmhumha 
  |                               |
  |                               |
  Taichleach                      Aodh, d. 1155.
  |                               |
  |_______________                |
  |           |                   Conchabhar God, d. 1231.
  |           |                   |
  Aodh     Murchadh               |
                                  Aodh, d. 1234. 
                                  |
                                  |
                                  Diarmuid Riabhach, d. 1250.
                                  |
                                  |
                                  Art na gCapall Ó hEaghra, d. 1316.
                                  |
                                  |_______________________________________________
                                  |                                              |
                                  |                                              |
                                  Domhnall Cléireach Ó hEaghra, d. 1318.      Seaán Mór
                                  |                                              |
                                  |                                              |
                                  Fearghal Mór Ó hEaghra, d. 1390.            Seaán Óg
                                  |                                      (Ó hEaghra Riabhach)
                                  |
                                  Tadhg Ó hEaghra, d. 1420
                                  |
                                  |____________________________________________
                                  |                                           |
                                  |                                           |
                                  Seaán Buidhe Ó hEaghra.                 Maoileachluinn
                                  |                                     (Ó hEaghra an Rúta)
                                  |_________________________________________________
                                  |                             |                  |
                                  |                             |                  |
                                  Ruaidhrí Ó hEaghra.     Muircheartach.       Tomoltach 
                                  |                                                |
                                  |                                                |
                                  Maghnus Ó hEaghra                              Cormac        Uilliam
                                  |                                                               |   
                                  |                                                               |
                                  Oilill Ó hEaghra                                              Seaán 
                                 =Onóra
                                  |
   . . . . . . . . . . . . . . . .|_________________________
   |                              |              |         |
   |                              |              |         |
   Ruaidhri                  Cian Ó hEaghra.  Domhnall.  Onóra.
   |                        =Úna ?
   |                         |
  Conn, d. 1581.             |____________________________________________________________________________
                             |                                                       |                  |
                             |                                                       |                  |
                             Cormac, d. 1612.                                      Brian, d. 1586.    Tadhg, d. 1560.
       =Máire Ní Suibhne    =Caitilín Ní Raghallaigh =Úna Ní Gallchobhair
        |                    |
        |                    |
        Tadhg, d. 1616.      Cormac Óg, d. 1642.
       =Síle Ní Ruairc.     =Cáit Ní Raghallaigh
        |                    |
   _____|___________         |______________________________________
   |              |          |                          |          |
   |              |          |                          |          |
   Cian, d. 1675. Tadhg      Oilill, d. 1685.          Brian    Cormac Óg
  =?                        =Jane Ní Flaithbertaigh            =Máire Ní Flaithbertaigh 
   |                                                               |
   |                                                               |
   Cian                                                          Ruaidhri
  =?
   |
   |
   Cormac O'Hara, d. 1776
  =?
   |
   |
   Cormac
   |
   |___________________________
   |                          |
   |                          |
  Maj. Charles King O'Hara    Jane O'Hara, d. 1874.
                             =Arthur Cooper
                              |                              
                              |
                              Charles W. O'Hara

          Donal F. O'Hara, fl. c. 1951. 

Preceded by Uathmarán mac Dobhailéin	King of Luighne Connacht; 926-926	Succeeded by Muirchertach mac Eaghra; Maol Da Bhonna mac Dobhailen

== See also ==
- O'Hara (surname)
