= Corca Fhir Trí =

Irish Clan

The Corca Fhir Trí were an Irish people located in the kingdom of Gailenga (later the barony of Gallen, County Mayo), Luighne Connacht and Corann (baronies of Leyney and Corann, County Sligo) in Gaelic Ireland.

Two kings of the Corca, Dobhailen mac Gormghus (died 885), and his son, Uathmarán mac Dobhailéin (died 920), were successive Kings of Luighne Connacht. Dobhailen was the eponym of the clan Dolan (surname) (Ó Dobhailen) of Connacht. Later kings of the Corca descended from him included:

- M928 - Maol Da Bhonna mac Dobhailen, king of Luighne, and Muircheartach mac Eagra, king of Luighne, were slain.
- M944.9 - Domhnall mac Uathmharan mac Dobhailen, lord of Corca-Firtri, died.
- M993.3 - Fogartach mac Diarmaid mac Uathmharan, lord of Corca-Firtri in Connacht, was slain by the Gaileanga of Corann.
- M1031.18 - Cú Sléibhe Ua Dobhailen, chief of Corca-Firtri, was treacherously slain.
- M1035.5 - Cú Sléibhe mac Dobhran, lord of Corca-Firtri, died.
