= Toichleach ua Gadhra =

King of Galienga, Ireland (died 964)

Toichleach Ua Gadhra, King of Gailenga, in medieval Ireland, died in 964.

Toichleach was a grandson of Gadhra, from whom the surname O'Gara derived. He may have been a son of Domhnall mac Gadhra, King of Gailenga, who was killed in 931.

The Annals of the Four Masters, sub anno 964, state that "A victory was gained by Comhaltan Ua Cleirigh, i.e. lord of Uí Fiachrach Aidhne, and by Maelseachlainn, son of Arcda, over Fergal Ua Ruairc, where seven hundred were lost, together with Toichleach Ua Gadhra, lord of South Luighne."

Preceded by Domhnall mac Gadhra?	King of Gailenga ?-964	Succeeded by Conghalach mac Laidhgnen ua Gadhra
