= Oliver O'Gara =

Irish politician and soldier

Oliver O'Gara was an Irish politician and soldier of the 17th and 18th centuries who was closely identified with the Jacobite cause.

== Family background ==
He was descended from the Ó Gadhra's of Luighne Connacht. After the Reformation his family had remained Roman Catholics. The O'Garas remained prominent figures in County Sligo. Oliver was the son Captain John O'Gara and Mary O'Conor. His paternal grandparents were Fearghal Ó Gadhra (Farell O'Gara) and Isobel Taaffe. Isobel Taaffe was a sister of John Taaffe, 1st Viscount Taaffe of Corren.

His maternal grandparents were Cathal O'Conor of Bellanagare Castle and Anne O'Molloy daughter of William 'Mor' O'Molloy, The O'Molloy. Cathal O'Conor was the third son of Sir Hugh O'Conor, O'Conor Don of Ballintober Castle in County Roscommon and Mary O'Rourke daughter of Sir Brian O'Rourke. Therefore, Oliver was a first cousin to the father of Charles O'Conor.

== Life ==
In 1689 O'Gara was a member of the Patriot Parliament where he represented the constituency of County Sligo. During the War of the Two Kings he was given command of a newly raised infantry regiment in the Irish Army which took part in an expedition led by Patrick Sarsfield to capture the Protestant-held town of Sligo. In 1690 O'Gara commanded the Jacobite garrison at Jamestown in County Leitrim, repulsing an advance by a much larger force of Williamite troops under James Douglas. In 1696 O'Gara became the proprietor of O'Gara's Dragoons.

O'Gara served with his regiment at the decisive Battle of Aughrim, which ended in Jacobite defeat. Following the Treaty of Limerick, O'Gara acted as a hostage until it was clear the terms had been honoured. He then went into exile as a Wild Geese, joining the Irish Brigade of the French Army. He was an influential figure at the Jacobite court-in-exile at Saint-Germain.

In 1727 the exiled James III awarded him a baronetcy and he was styled by the Jacobites as Sir Oliver O'Gara, but this was never recognised by the Irish government in Dublin.

== Marriage and issue ==
O'Gara married Mary Fleming, daughter of Randall Fleming, 21st Baron Slane a leading Old English family of The Pale. She was the widow of Richard Fleming Esq of County Meath and had a daughter named Bridget by that union. Bridget later married Randell Plunkett, 10th Baron Dunsany.

He had five children with her, all of them born in France. The three eldest of his four sons became military men, joining the armies of various Continental nations. His eldest son John Patrick O'Gara rose to the rank of Brigadier in the Spanish service. The youngest Charles O'Gara rose to become a senior courtier at the Austrian court in Vienna.

== Bibliography ==
- Wauchope, Piers. Patrick Sarsfield and the Williamite War. Irish Academic Press, 1992.
- Melville Henry Massue Ruvigny Et Raineval. The Jacobite Peerage, Baronetage, Knightage, and Grants of Honour. Genealogical Publishing, 2003.
