= Conghalach mac Laidhgnen ua Gadhra =

Conghalach mac Laidhgnen ua Gadhra, King of Gailenga, died 993.

Conghalach was a son of Laidhgnen ua Gadhra, who was in turn a grandson of Gadhra, from whom the surname O'Gara derived.

Preceded by Toichleach ua Gadhra	King of Gailenga; 964?-993	Succeeded by ?
