= Ó Lóthcháin =

Surname

Ó Lóthcháin is a surname of Gaelic-Irish origin. It has various forms such as Ó Lothcháin, úa Lothcháin, Ó Leocáin, Ó Leocháin and Ó Lothcháin and has been Anglicised into many surnames. Examples include: O'Loughlan, Logan, Lohan, Lagan, Loghan, Loughan, Duck and Duke (among others).

The Ó Lóthcháin were a noble Gaelic family that controlled Gailenga Móra but were dispersed during the Norman Invasion of Ireland. The Ó Lóthcháin were a sept of either the Connachta or the Uí Neills. This is further evidenced by Cúán úa Lothcháin's position as chief ollamh to King Malachy Mór (Máel Sechnaill mac Domnaill) of the Ui Neills.

Genealogical records from fragments 64r of Rawlinson 502 onwards contains genealogies in which Léocán (likely the progenitor of the line) and his descendants are noted.

The surname "Duck" has been cited as a "far-fetched synonym" or Anglicisation of the surname Ó Lóthcáin and its related names. This bastardisation of the name has also been changed further in the 1900s to Duke. There are Dukes in the Counties of Longford, Westmeath and Roscommon, the historic area of control by the Ó Lothcháin sept. Notably, Teffia is a placename in Co. Longford. This shares the name with the location of Tethba from which Cúán úa Lothcháin was from and in which he was murdered.
