= Ferghal Dubh Ó Gadhra =

Priest and Scholar

Ferghal Dubh Ó Gadhra, a.k.a. Father Nicholas Ó Gadhra O.S.A. (fl. 1655-after 5 June 1686) was an Irish cleric and scribe.

== Biography ==
Ó Gadhra was the compiler of the O Gara Manuscript (now RIA MS 23 F 16), which he compiled at Antwerp and Lisle between 1655 and 1659. He "returned to Ireland some time before June 5th, 1686, at which date he certifies that he is safe and sound at Bannada {san mBeinn fhada\ county Sligo. In a colophon he craves the reader's indulgence for errors and omissions, because he had never a teacher. Evidently his task was a labour of love."

== See also ==
- Fearghal Ó Gadhra, patron of the Annals of the Four Masters
