= Luighne Connacht =

Ancient territory in Connacht, Ireland

Luighne
- Túath/ Tríocha Céad
- History
  - Created: uncertain
  - Abolished: 1603
  - Succeeded by: Barony of Leyny, County Sligo
- Status: Túath (Territory)
- Subdivisions
  - Type: Parishes/Townlands

Luighne Connacht was a territory located in north-central Connacht, on the borders of what is now County Mayo and County Sligo, Ireland. The Tuatha of Luighne was co-extensive with the modern day boundary of the Roman Catholic Diocese of Achonry

== Origin ==
The Luighne, the "tribe of Lugh" were a people, originally found in Brega, south of Kells in what is now County Meath.The baronies of Lune in Meath, and Leyney in Sligo, were called after them. According to Lambert McKenna (pp.xvi-xvii):

"[They] probably acquired their land in Connacht as a reward for military service rendered to the tribes which had victoriously invaded that part of the country. Their migration ... and their settlement in Connacht are constantly referred to in the poems of this book" (see The Book of O'Hara) "and are the chief subject of the story of the Battle of Crionna; it evidently remained a very lively tradition among them even down to late times."

According to this story, the Luighne accompanied Tadhg mac Cian, who "The genealogists brought Tadc and his descendants from Éli in northern Munster, but since we find the Luigni and Gailenga closely associated as neighbours and allies in Connacht ... there is reason to agree with MacNeill that they were vassal tribes of fighting men whom the Connachta and Ui Neill ... planted on the lands they had conquered" (IKHK, p. 69)

Of the original Brega-based tribes called Gailenga, Luigni, Saitne, Delbhna, Ciannachta, Francis John Byrne goes on to say: "the Brega peoples of that name ... extending as they did in a group of tribal kingdoms from Glasnevin to Lough Ramor in Cavan, give the impression of a remarkably homogeneous body. They are so closely connected that in the later period before the Norman invasion we find that the kingship of the various tribes seem to have been interchangeable. They form a striking contrast to the population of Mide... But the Boyne valley had been an area of settled culture since Neolithic times, so that it is likely that a basic unity persisted under the superstructures of succeeding conquests." (IKHK, p. 69) Members of these population-groups were able to exploit the political weakness of the Clann Cholmáin during the 11th and 12th centuries and become Kings of Brega after centuries of subordination.

== The Luighne of Connacht ==
The early Connachta had close alliances with the Luighne, Gailenga, Grecraige and Corca Fhir Trí, all of whom were found in close association with that Connachta territory west of the Shannon. ("It was probably not until the end of the 6th century that the name Connachta was restricted to those of the dynastic group who remained in the west: the Uí Fiachrach, Uí Briúin and Uí Ailello." IKHK, p. 231).

In Connacht, the Luighne and neighbouring tribes were classed as Fortuatha ("kingdoms not ruled directly by members of the dominant dynasty of a province", IKHK, p. 45), meaning external or alien tribes. Byrne notes that the Luighne dominated smaller, minor tribes (including the likes of the Calraige, Grecraige and Corca Fhir Trí), "and have some claim to be considered an over-kingdom, as was recognised in the 12th century when their lands were erected into the diocese of Achonry."

McKenna (p.xvii) writes "Less common that "Luighne" there is "Luighne Connacht", the use of which is puzzling. sometime it appears to be synonymous with "Luighne". ... On the other hand, "Luighne Connacht" is often used to denote a folk distinct from "Luighne".' In Rawlinson B 502 ... we find a separate "genealogy of Luighne Connacht" breaking off from the main Luighne line somewhere in the 8th century, and descending from Ceannfhaoloadh brother of Flaithgheas. (see Genealogy, below).

== Genealogy ==
   Ailill Aulom
   |
   |________________________________________
   |                         |            |
   |                         |            |
   Cormac Cas Eógan Már Cian
   |                         |            |
   |                         |            |
   Dal gCais Eóganacht Tadhg (Eile, Ciannachta, Gailenga, Luigni, Delbna, Saitne, &co)
                                          |
                             _____________|___________
                            |                        |
                            |                        |
                            Cormac Gaileang Connla
                            |
                            |
                            Loi
                            |
                            |_________________
                            |                |
                            |                |
                            Nia Corb Art Corb
                            |
                            |
                            Art
                            |
                            |
                            Fiodhchuire
                            |
                            |
                            Fidsheng
                            |
                            |
                            Natfraoch
                            |
                            |
                            Brénuinn
                            |
                            |
                            Fionnbharr
                            |
                            |
                            Diarmaid Mór
                            |
                            |
                            Ceann Faoladh
                            |
                            |
                            Taicleach
                            |
                            |______________________________
                            |                          |
                            |                          |
                            Flaithgheas Ceann Faoladh
                            |                          |
                            |                          |
                            Béc                "Luighne Connacht"
                            |
                            |
                            Saorghus
                            |
                            |________________________________________________
                            |                                              |
                            |                                              |
                            Eaghra Poprigh mac Saorghus, d. 928.   Sleiteachán
                            |                                              |
                            |                                              |
                      Clann Ó hEaghra Gadhra
                                                                           |
                                                                           |
                                                                 Domhnall mac Gadhra, d. 931.
                                                                           |
                                                                           |
                                                                     Clann Ó Gadhra

== The Three Luighne ==
An Teora Sloinnte Luighne (the three Luighne) appear to have been the clans of Ó hEaghra, Ó Gadhra and Ó Dobhailen; the latter descend from Dobhailen mac Gormghus, noted on his death in 885 as king of Luighne Connacht. Dobhailen is explicitly listed as of the Corca Fhir Trí, so his people, originally themselves thought to be subject to the Luighne, had come to rank as one of Luighne's ruling dynasties.

McKenna further states (p.xviii-xix): "In their many entries the Annals use the word Gaileanga to indicate sometimes a people but more often, especially in their later ones, a district, i.e., the district afterwards known as the barony of Gallen. In 993, the Lord of Gaileanga is said to be Ua Gadhra. Hence it would appear probable that the territory afterwards called Gallen was at first ruled by its Gaileanga princes, and that towards the end of the 10th century it came under the power of the chieftains of Luighne, chiefly that of the Í Ghadhra, who ruled it till the early 13th century when they were thrust aside by the Jordans; it is often afterwards referred to as Mac Jordan's country."

== See also ==
- Kings of Luighne Connacht
- Luighne Brega
- Mac Siúrtáin
