= Domhnall Ó Gadhra =

Domhnall Ó Gadhra, King of Sliabh Lugha, died 1217.

The Annals of the Four Masters merely report that Donnell O'Gara died in the year 1217. They do not specifically state that he was king, though he would not have been recorded had he not been of some prominence.

| Preceded by Ruairí Ó Gadhra | King of Sliabh Lugha; 1206?-1217 | Succeeded by Donn Sléibhe Ó Gadhra |
