= David Dolan =

David Dolan may refer to:

- David Dolan (boxer)
- David Dolan (pianist)
- David Dolan (politician)
