= Ruaidrí Ó Gadhra =

Ruaidrí Ó Gadhra (died 1256) was an Irish king of Sliabh Lugha and Chief of the Name.

During Ruaidrí's lifetime the territory of Sliabh Lugha was conquered by the Sheriff of Connacht, Jordan de Exeter (died 1258), ancestor of the Clan Mac Siúrtáin. Sliabh Lugha would from this time become known as Tir Mac Síurtáin (Mac Jordan's Country), in time becoming the barony of Gallen.

As a result of this, the Clan Ó Gadhra were forced north into Cuil Ui Fionn (barony of Coolavin, County Sligo), which would become their new home.

The Annals of the Four Masters record a number of incidents concerning the Ó Gadhra family during Ruaidhri's reign:

- M1228.2. A great war broke out in Connaught between the two sons of Roderic O'Conor, Hugh and Turlough, after the death of the Hugh above-mentioned, for the younger son did not yield submission to the elder; and they destroyed Connaught between them, and desolated the region extending from Easdara Ballysadare, southwards, to the river of Hy-Fiachrach, excepting only a small portion of Sliabh Lugha, and the territory of the people of Airtech.
- M1228.5. Murtough, the son of Flaherty O'Flanagan, was slain by the sons of Teige O'Gara.
- M1237.9. A prey was taken by Conor, son of Cormac, from Rory O'Gara, and Rory's brother was slain.
- M1241.8. Teige, the son of Rory O'Gara, died.

In 1256, Ruaidhri was slain by David, son of Richard Cuisin, who was apparently of the family that would go on to produce Ádhamh Cúisín, a scribe and genealogist who lived c. 1400 and was a compiler of Leabhar Ua Maine.

Ruaidhri was succeeded by Ruaidri Ó Gadhra.

Preceded by Donn Sléibhe Ó Gadhra	King of Sliabh Lugha; 1227?-1256	Succeeded by Ruaidri Ó Gadhra

Preceded by Donn Sléibhe Ó Gadhra	Ó Gadhra; 1227?-1256	Succeeded by Ruaidri Ó Gadhra
