= Cú Mara mac Maic Liac =

Cú Mara mac Mac Liac (died 1030) was an Irish poet who held the post of Chief Ollam of Ireland.

His obit is given in the Annals of the Four Masters as follows- "M1030.17 Cumara, son of Macliag, chief poet of Ireland, died." His obit is given in the Annals of Ulster as follows- "U1030.8 Cú Mara son of Mac Liac, chief ollav of Ireland, died." His obit is given in the Annals of Loch Cé as follows- "LC1030.9 Cumhara, son of Mac-Liag, chief poet of Erinn, died." His obit is given in the Annals of Tigernach as follows- "Cu mara mac Maic Liag [ son of Mac Liac ] mortuus est".

== See also ==
- Muircheartach mac Cu Ceartach Mac Liag

Preceded by Cúán úa Lothcháin	Chief Ollam of Ireland; 1024–1030	Succeeded by Mac Beathaidh mac Ainmire
