= Donn Sléibhe Ó Gadhra =

Irish king (d. 1217)

Donn Sléibhe Ó Gadhra, King of Sliabh Lugha, died 1217.

The Annals of the Four Masters record Donn Sléibhe demise in some detail, sub anno 1227:

- Donslevy O'Gara, Lord of Sliabh Lugha, was slain by Gillaroe, his own brother's son, after the latter had, on the same night, forcibly taken a house from him and Gillaroe himself was afterwards put to death for this crime by the devise of Hugh O'Conor.

Preceded by Domhnall Ó Gadhra	King of Sliabh Lugha; 1217?-1227	Succeeded by Ruaidrí Ó Gadhra
