= Ruairí Ó Gadhra =

Ruairí Ó Gadhra, King of Sliabh Lugha, died 1206.

The Annals of the Four Masters appear to contain one of the few references to Ruairí, reporting that Rory O'Gara, Lord of Sliabh Lugha, died in the year 1206.

Preceded by Donn Sléibhe Ua Gadhra	King of Sliabh Lugha; 1181?–1206	Succeeded by Domhnall Ó Gadhra
