= Diocese of Achonry =

The Diocese of Achonry (Irish: Deoise Achadh Conaire) may refer to:

- Roman Catholic Diocese of Achonry
- The former Church of Ireland diocese of Achonry is now incorporated within the united Diocese of Tuam, Limerick and Killaloe (Church of Ireland)

== See also ==
- Bishop of Achonry
