= Andy Dolan =

Scottish footballer (1920–1971)

Personal information
- Full name: Andrew Dolan
- Date of birth: 2 August 1920
- Place of birth: Glasgow, Scotland
- Date of death: 1 January 1971 (aged 50)
- Place of death: Glasgow, Scotland
- Position: Inside forward

Senior career*
Years	Team	Apps	(Gls)
1946–1947	Alloa Athletic	10	(3)
1947–1948	Raith Rovers	23	(6)
1948–1949	Bury	10	(2)
1949–1950	Accrington Stanley	19	(4)
1950–1951	Albion Rovers	10	(4)
Total		72	(19)
- * Club domestic league appearances and goals

Andrew Dolan (20 August 1920 – 1 January 1971) was a Scottish professional footballer who played as an inside forward in the Football League.
