= Garry (surname) =

Garry is an Irish surname. It is a reduced Anglicized form of McGarry or O’Gara. Notable people with the surname include:

- Ben Garry (1956–2006), American football player
- Charles Garry (1909–1991), American civil rights attorney
- Chief Garry (1811–1892), Native American leader of the Middle Spokane tribe
- Colleen Garry (born 1962), American politician
- Flora Garry (1900–2000), Scottish poet
- Jim Garry (1869–1917), American baseball player
- Len Garry (1942–2026), English musician
- Robert Campbell Garry (1900–1993) Scottish physician
- Ryan Garry (born 1983), English footballer
- Ted Garry (1885–1955), Scottish footballer
- Vivien Garry (1920–2008), American jazz bassist
