= Cúán úa Lothcháin =

Irish poet

Cúán úa Lothcháin was an Irish poet from Tethba, now in County Meath. He was the Chief Ollam of Ireland and died in 1024. He was part of the Ó Lóthcháin sept of Gailenga Móra - part of either the Connachta or Uí Néill.

Born in the region of Tethba - part of the kingdom of Mide - Cúán acted as bard and propagandist for High King Máel Sechnaill mac Domnaill (died 1022).

The Annals of Ulster give his obit as- "U1024.3 Cuán ua Lothcháin, chief poet of Ireland, was killed in Tethba by the men of Tethba themselves. The party that killed him became putrid within the hour. That was a poet's miracle."

The Annals of the Four Masters give his obit as- "M1024.4 Cuan Ua Lothchain, chief poet of Ireland, and a learned historian, was slain in Teathbha, and the party who killed him became putrid in one hour; and this was a poet's miracle."

The Annals of Inisfallen give his obit as- "AI1024.6 Cúán. Ua Lothcháin, chief poet of Ireland and a historian, was slain by the men of Tethba; and the man who slew him, i.e. the son of Gilla Ultáin, son of Roduib, was killed forthwith."

The Annals of Loch Cé give his obit as- "LC1024.4 Cuan Ua Lochain, i.e. the chief poet of Erinn, was slain by the men of Tethfa. God performed a ‘poet's miracle,’ manifestly, on the party that killed him, for they died an evil death, and their bodies were not buried until wolves and birds preyed upon them."

The Chronicon Scotorum give his obit as- "Annal CS1024 Kalends. Cuán ua Lothcháin, chief poet of Ireland and an expert in tradition lore was killed in Tebtha, and those nine who killed him turned putrid and that is a poet's miracle."

Preceded by Clothna mac Aenghusa	Chief Ollam of Ireland; 1008–1024	Succeeded by Cú Mara mac Mac Liac
