= Wes Dolan =

English singer-songwriter, musician and actor (born 1980)

Wes Dolan (born Wesley Joseph Free Dolan, 31 October 1980) is an English singer-songwriter, musician and actor.

He is known for songs such as "Land Of Fear" and "Blue Moon Inn". Written for Philip Gardiner's The Stone - No Soul Unturned movie and Paranormal Haunting - The Curse Of The Blue Moon Inn, both of these songs featured in his debut album Reason To Exist, which reached number 3 in the Amazon blues download charts. Dolan also appeared as a guest musician on Mindscape a Sky TV series for two seasons, Performing live with artists such as No Redemption, Arthur Brown, China Soul and Steve Hackett.

His lyrics are themed on political, social and philosophical issues. Inspired by artists such as Bob Dylan, Woody Guthrie, Shane MacGowan, Bob Marley as well as his father, Liam, and uncle Joe Dolan. His music spans a variety of genres, including blues, folk, rock and Irish folk music.

Dolan performs vocals with guitar and harmonica. Backed by a variety of musicians, he has performed for TV and films since April 2010, and at festivals and concerts since 2006. The Stone - No Soul Unturned, which Dolan also starred in, won an award for 'Best Foreign Film' at the Mountain Film Festival in 2011. His debut album was released by Reality Entertainment.

== Life and career ==
Dolan was born at King's Mill Hospital in Mansfield, Nottinghamshire, England, where we was also raised. His father and uncle emigrated from Ireland when they were two years old and both became singer-songwriters. Dolan began writing, singing songs and playing guitar in the late 1990s. He was a busker as well as a performer at various festivals and pubs learning his trade with his father, Liam and (late) uncle Joe Dolan. At this time, Dolan was also studying at the University of Derby, where he gained a degree majoring in Creative Writing and minoring in Theatre, Film and Television Studies.

Dolan was known by most locals as a busker on the streets of Mansfield. This was where he got his first chance to become involved in acting, as well as writing and performing music for film and television, when he was invited to work on The Plague, a futuristic British horror film, created and produced by Nik Spencer. Spencer spotted Dolan busking and also asked him to write a number of songs for the soundtrack of the film. Whilst working on The Plague, Dolan met Phil Gardiner who was impressed with his work and asked him to play a leading role in the award-winning film, The Stone - No Soul Unturned. Dolan also wrote and produced a song called 'Land of Fear', which featured in the film.

In 2011, Dolan also performed on several occasions as a resident musician on Mindscape for Sky TV. He wrote and recorded "Blue Moon Inn", for Paranormal Haunting - The Curse Of The Blue Moon Inn and signed a deal with Reality Entertainment, an independent record label who released his debut album on 8 September 2011. "Reason To Exist" reached number 3 in the Amazon blues chart. Dolan has stated that the closing of coal mines in Nottinghamshire was a significant influence on the album.

Dolan has also released music videos for his songs "Blue Moon Inn" and "Land Of Fear". "Blue Moon Inn" also featured his ex-partner, Laura Wilcockson playing violin.

In January 2019, Dolan was invited to play music on Mansfield 103.2 FM in commemoration of the 50th anniversary of The Beatles' rooftop concert. This ultimately led to Dolan temporarily holding a slot on the station, 'Wes Dolan's Curiosity Shop', beginning in March 2019.

== Sources ==
- Mindscape magazine - July 2011
- The Mansfield Chad newspaper - August 2011
- Mindscape magazine - August 2011
- Maximum Ink online magazine - August 2011
