= David Dolan (pianist) =

Concert pianist

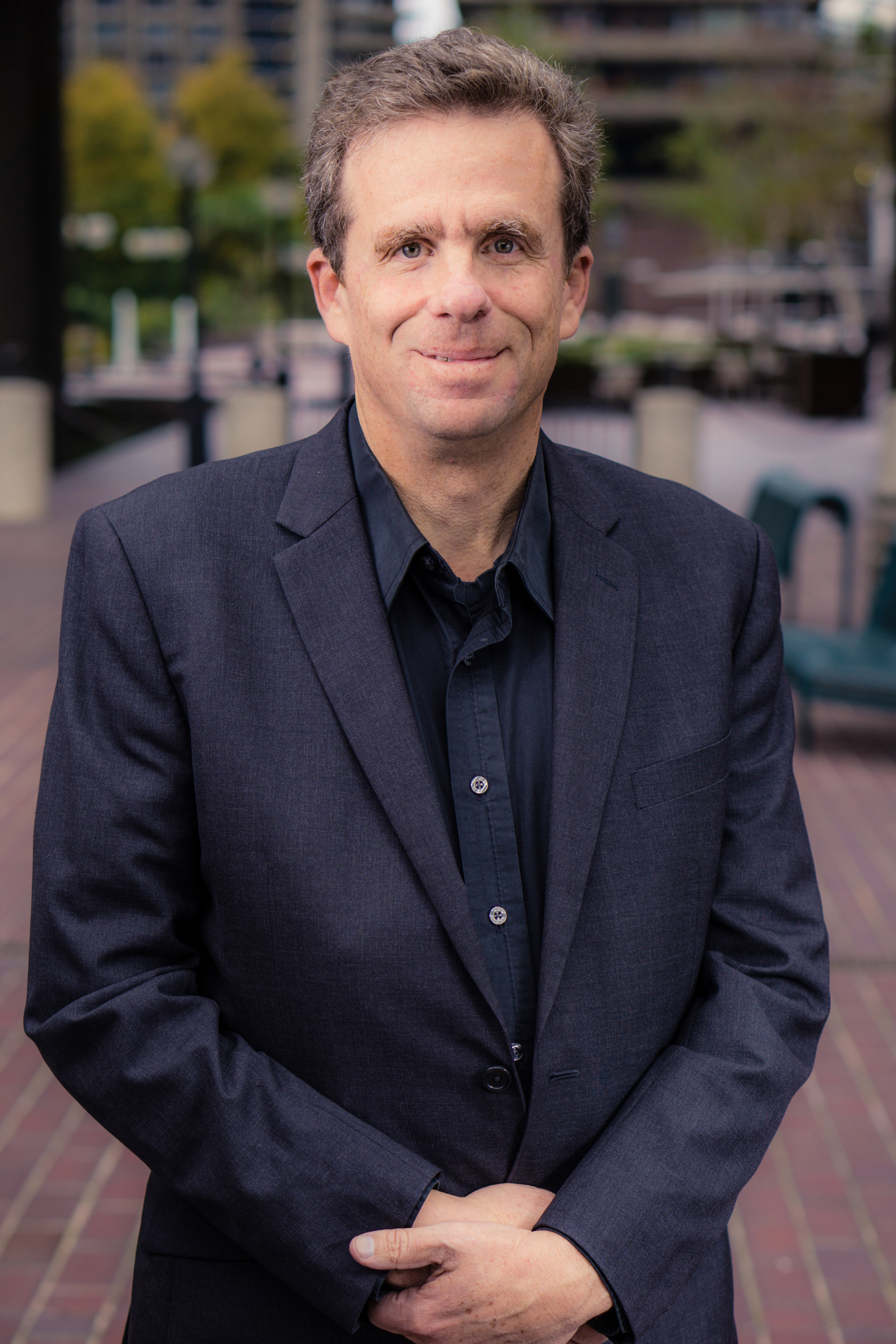
Professor David Dolan at the Guildhall School of Music & Drama, Barbican Centre, London

David Dolan (born 25 November 1955) is a concert pianist, researcher and educator. He devotes an important part of his career to the revival of the art of classical improvisation. Professor of classical improvisation and its application on creativity in performance at the Guildhall School of Music and Drama in London, he is Head of the Centre for Creative Performance and Classical Improvisation. He also teaches at the Yehudi Menuhin School following Lord Menuhin's invitation in 1989.

== Background and studies ==
Dolan was born in Israel where he studied piano with Prof. Sonia Valin and composition and improvisation with Haim Alexander at the Jerusalem Academy of Music and Dance, obtaining his B. Mus. and Artist Diploma - Summa Cum Laude. He then studied with Leon Fleisher at the Peabody Institute in Baltimore and with Claude Frank in New York. In 1977 he took part in Arthur Rubinstein's master class in Jerusalem. His PhD work (University of Paris and Hebrew University of Jerusalem) examined parallels between emotional expression in speech and musical improvisation. Later research has focused on classical improvisation and its impact on creativity, as well as communication and expression between performers and their audiences during performances.

== Career ==
Dolan has performed in many of the world's leading concert venues and festivals, such as the Wigmore Hall and the Royal Festival Hall in London, Auditorium Châtelet and Salle Pleyel in Paris, Concertgebouw and Dr. Anton Philipszaal in the Hague in the Netherlands, the Jerusalem Theater and Tel Aviv Museum of Art in Israel. He has made live recordings and broadcasts for several European radio and TV stations.

Dolan has been giving master classes and workshops at a number of international festivals and music institutions, such as the Juilliard School, the Royal College of Music in London, the Tchaikovsky Conservatory in Moscow, the Fryderyk Chopin University of Music in Warsaw, the New England Conservatory in Boston, the Jerusalem and Tel-Aviv Music Academies, Verbier Festival, the Sibelius Academy in Helsinki, University of Auckland and University of Waikato in New Zealand, Norwegian Academy of Music in Oslo and the Paris and Geneva Conservatories. Dolan is an associate fellow in music at Clare Hall, Cambridge. Since 2011, he has run a programme of classical improvisation applied to performance at the Australian National Academy of Music (ANAM) in Melbourne based on annual intensive residencies.
