= John Patrick O'Gara =

John Patrick O'Gara was a French-born soldier of Irish descent who served in the Spanish Army during the eighteenth century.

He was the son of Colonel Oliver O'Gara, a Jacobite exile who left Ireland for France following the surrender of forces loyal to James III under the Treaty of Limerick. Colonel O'Gara settled in Saint-Germain where James' exiled court was in residence. The Colonel married Mary Fleming, daughter of Randall Fleming, 21st Baron Slane, and had five children with her of whom John Patrick was the eldest, being baptised on 25 October 1692.

Like many other sons of the Wild Geese, he sought a career in one of the Continental armies as the Penal Laws forbade Catholics from serving in either the British or Irish Army. O'Gara's career was fairly successful, rising to the rank of Brigadier. Two of his younger brothers also joined the Spanish Army, while another Charles O'Gara became a courtier at the Austrian court in Vienna.

== Bibliography ==
- Melville Henry Massue Ruvigny Et Raineval. The Jacobite Peerage, Baronetage, Knightage, and Grants of Honour. Genealogical Publishing, 2003.
