= Barrie Dunsmore =

Canadian journalist (1939-2018)

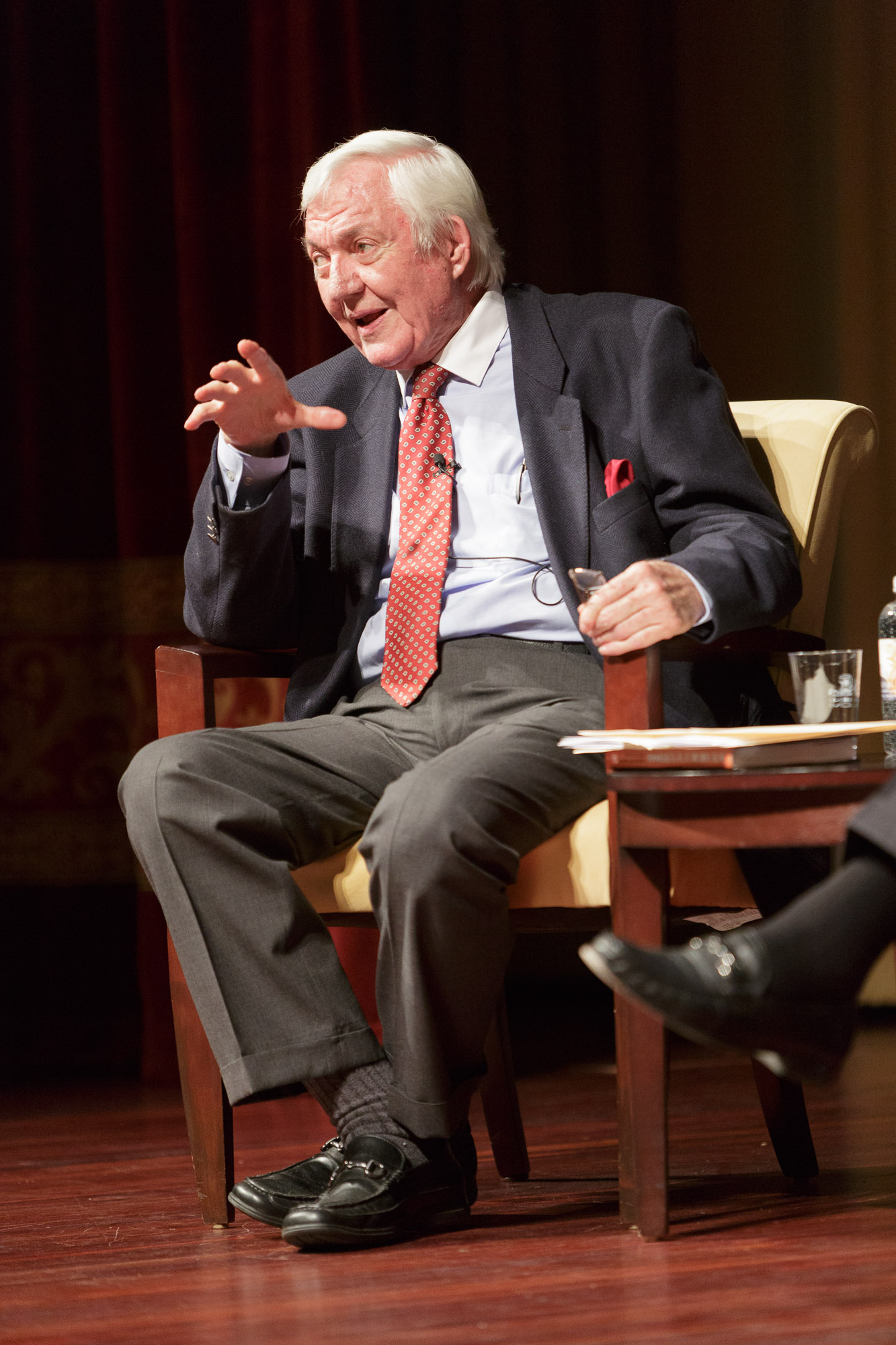
Dunsmore in 2017

Barrie Dunsmore (1939 – 26 August 2018) was a Canadian journalist who covered foreign affairs for ABC News, the American television network, for 30 years.

Dunsmore was born in 1939 in Regina, Saskatchewan, Canada. From 1965 to 1995, Dunsmore reported from Washington and more than one hundred countries on virtually every major international event: from wars, to summits, to the policies of seven U.S. presidents from Johnson to Clinton. From the height of the Cold War until its end, Dunsmore was regularly present when American presidents and Soviet leaders met. He was with Israeli troops when they captured the Suez Canal from Egypt in 1967 and when General Ariel Sharon put the city of Suez under siege in 1973. He was on Henry Kissinger's Middle East Shuttles in the aftermath of the 1973 war and was with President Jimmy Carter in the Middle East six years later when he finally cemented the historic Israeli-Egyptian peace treaty. Dunsmore covered the fall of South Vietnam in 1975, conducted the first American television interview with Egyptian President Anwar Sadat, and was with three former presidents (Nixon, Ford and Carter) who attended Sadat's funeral. He watched SCUD missiles fall on Saudi Arabia during the 1991 Gulf War. He had a worldwide scoop on the Soviet invasion of Afghanistan in 1979, and he did the first American television report on the destruction of the Amazon rainforests in 1988.

As ABC's senior foreign correspondent from 1984 to 1991, Dunsmore focused on events in Eastern Europe and the Soviet Union as the Iron Curtain began to disintegrate. Throughout 1989, he witnessed dramatic moments in the collapse of communism and reported live for ABC News Nightline from the Berlin Wall the night it began to fall. After retirement in 1995, Dunsmore became a Fellow at the Joan Shorenstein Center on the Press, Politics and Public Policy at the John F. Kennedy School of Government at Harvard University. He received the School of Foreign Service at Georgetown University's Edward Weintal Prize in 1995.

Barrie Dunsmore was the author of "There and Back: Commentary by a Former Foreign Correspondent," published in 2011 by Wind Ridge Publishing, Inc.

Former Secretary of State Henry Kissinger said of Dunsmore's book, "This compilation of essays dating from the weeks when he accompanied me on the Mideast shuttles in the early 1970's, to his commentaries on the Arab Spring will mark Dunsmore firmly as one of the significant journalists of our era."

Dunsmore moved to Charlotte, Vermont, after retirement, and wrote a Sunday column for the Rutland Herald. He died on Sunday, August 26, 2018, at the age of 79.
