= Guiry =

Guiry is a surname. Notable people with the surname include:

- Bill Guiry, Irish Gaelic footballer
- Michael D. Guiry (born 1949), Irish phycologist and founder of AlgaeBase
- Tom Guiry (born 1981), American actor

== See also ==
- Guiry-en-Vexin, a commune in the Val-d'Oise department in Île-de-France in northern France
