= Charles O'Gara =

- Born: 1699; Saint-Germain, France
- Died: 1777 (aged 77–78); Brussels, Austrian Netherlands
- Occupation: Courtier

Charles O'Gara (born 1699 in Saint-Germain, d. 1777) was a French-born courtier of Irish parentage who rose to prominence in the service of Leopold, Duke of Lorraine and later his son Francis I, Holy Roman Emperor. Like the rest of his family he was a Jacobite who supported the return of Stuart rule to the British and Irish kingdoms.

His father was the Irish Colonel and Member of Parliament Oliver O'Gara who was one of the Wild Geese who left Ireland following the Treaty of Limerick at the end of the Williamite War which ended in defeat for the Jacobites. Colonel O'Gara settled in France at the Saint-Germain court of the exiled James II. Charles was the fourth of five children born to Colonel O'Gara and his wife Mary Fleming. He was baptised at Saint-Germain on 16 July with the exiled King James as his Godfather. His three elder brothers, including John Patrick O'Gara, all joined the Spanish Army.

O'Gara was appointed equerry to the two sons of Leopold, the Duke of Lorraine. When Francis the elder of these became Holy Roman Emperor in 1745, O'Gara was appointed an Imperial Counciller and a Chamberlain at the court in Vienna. O'Gara was rewarded for his service by being made a Count of the Holy Roman Empire and a Knight of the Golden Fleece. He became very wealthy and retired to Brussels, where he died, unmarried and childless in 1777. In his will, his heirs were his older half sisters three grandchildren - Randell Plunkett, 12th Baron Dunsany and his two sisters Rose and Bridget Plunkett as well as his second cousin Charles O'Conor.

== Bibliography ==
- Melville Henry Massue Ruvigny Et Raineval. The Jacobite Peerage, Baronetage, Knightage, and Grants of Honour. Genealogical Publishing, 2003.
- Thomas O'Connor & Mary Ann Lyons. Irish communities in early modern Europe. Four Courts Press, 2006.
