= Kings of Sliabh Lugha =

Irish kings (12th–13th centuries)

The Kings of Sliabh Lugha were rulers of the district of Sliabh Lugha located in what is now the barony of Costello, County Mayo, Ireland.

The Sliabh Lugha area was originally part of Gailenga but by the 12th-century was separately called Sliabh Lugha. Its rulers were the Ó Gadhra, whose ancestors were Kings of Luighne Connacht, an over-kingdom of which Gailenga/Sliabh Lugha was the southern part. The northern area, lying in southwest County Sligo, retained the name Luighne.

After the Anglo-Norman conquest of Connacht, the Gailenga portion was known as the barony of Gallen, and ruled by the Clan Mac Siúrtáin until the early 17th century, while the Sliabh Lugha portion was ruled by a Norman Costello family.

== List of kings ==
- 1181 - Donn Sléibhe Ua Gadhra, king of Sleibe Lughu, died.
- 1206 - Ruairí Ó Gadhra, Lord of Sliabh Lugha, died.
- 1217 - Domhnall Ó Gadhra, died.
- 1227 - Donn Sléibhe Ó Gadhra, was slain by Gillaroe, his own brother's son.
- 1256 - Ruaidrí Ó Gadhra, was slain by David, son of Richard Cuisin
