= TelVue =

TelVue Corporation
- Industry: Broadcast Technology, Cloud-Hosted Broadcast, Streaming Media, Video on Demand
- Founded: 1986
- Headquarters: Mount Laurel Township, New Jersey, United States
- Key people: Jesse Lerman, CEO & President; Mark Steele, CIO; Paul Andrews, SVP, Sales & Marketing
- Products: Video servers, Cloud-based Broadcast Services, Bulletin Board Systems, Streaming Media and Video on Demand services
- Number of employees: 16
- Website: telvue.com

TelVue Corporation is a digital media company that develops broadcast solutions for multiple platforms including television, over-the-top content, Internet streaming, and mobile devices. TelVue has deployed broadcast systems and cloud-based services to media companies, professional broadcasters, and a network of municipally owned public, educational, and government access (PEG) cable TV channels. In addition, TelVue provides systems and services to colleges, universities and K-12 institutions. TelVue Corporation is a 100% employee-owned company.

TelVue Corporation began as a subsidiary of Science Dynamics Corporation of Cherry Hill, NJ on November 26, 1986, and was spun off as a separate publicly traded company on December 30, 1988. Using patents developed by Science Dynamics Corporation, TelVue began providing cable companies with a method of processing their customers’ orders by telephone for individually viewed and billed Pay Per View (PPV) movies and events, without the need for a live operator or the technical requirement for a two-way interactive cable system.

In 1998, TelVue began offering cable affiliates and cable & satellite programming providers the ability to have their customers order PPV movies and events directly via the Internet, using TelVue's patented internet ordering application.

In 2003, TelVue entered into an entirely new business; by providing comprehensive programming and technical services to municipalities, schools, and communities, to upgrade the look, feel and content of their local cable access (PEG) channels. These programming services are provided centrally from TelVue headquarters in Mt. Laurel, NJ.

In 2007, TelVue Corporation acquired Princeton Server Group, a provider of professional digital video broadcast systems.

In July 2008, TelVue launched a new corporate brand identity, consolidating the product portfolios of TelVue and Princeton Server Group. The digital broadcast systems of Princeton Server Group were rebranded as the TelVue Princeton Series. With the advent of IP broadcast technology, TelVue debuted the HyperCaster IP Broadcast Server in 2010.

In May 2011, TelVue announced that through partnership with Roku, PEG.tv stations are now accessible on demand to anyone with a Roku box.

As hyperlocal channels started the transition to HD broadcast, a number of stations adopted TelVue's HD broadcast technology to deliver their new HD signals to the headend. In 2014, TelVue added 4K capability to its line of broadcast servers.

As of 2016, TelVue was powering more than 2,500 PEG stations nationally, and providing broadcast solutions to nine of the top ten Multiple Service Operators in the United States.

In 2018, TelVue restructured as an employee-owned corporation.

== Key products ==
- TelVue HyperCaster IP Broadcast Servers: As broadcasters moved to an IPTV platform, TelVue came out with its HyperCaster series of broadcast servers for IP channel origination. The HyperCaster can manage and schedule up to 20 linear channels in a single box. When integrated with the TelVue ProVue IP decoder, the HyperCaster can manage on-screen graphics and branding, as well as up- and down-convert SD/HD.
- TelVue Connect cloud-based content management system: In 2012, TelVue unveiled a cloud-based content aggregation, transcoding and management system for professional broadcast, called TelVue Connect.
- TelVue CloudCast streaming media and video on demand service: Formerly known as PEG.TV, TelVue CloudCast is an internet streaming service that handles both linear and on-demand video delivery to multiple screens, including Over-theTop settop boxes like Roku, and mobile devices. In 2016, TelVue CloudCast became an application within the TelVue Connect CMS.
- TelVue InfoVue is a dynamic digital signage system that was released in 2015 to replace the previous WEBUS community bulletin board system. InfoVue displays current weather, traffic and RSS feeds on screen.
- The TelVue AdCaster is a digital ad server that was added to the TelVue line of products in 2013. The AdCaster is available in two models (A100 & A1000) and designed to lower the cost of local ad insertion (DPI) for broadcast and cable providers. The AdCaster integrates with industry standard ad splicers and traffic and billing systems.
