= Ruaidri Ó Gadhra =

Ruaidri Ó Gadhra (died 1285) was an Irish Lord.

The Annals of the Four Masters record, sub anno 1285, "Rory O'Gara, Lord of Sliabh-Lugha, was slain by Mac Feorais Bermingham on Lough O'Gara." However, by this stage the family had been exiled into Cul Ui Fionn (Coolavin, County Sligo).

Preceded by Ruaidrí Ó Gadhra	Ó Gadhra; 1256?-1285	Succeeded by ?
