= Kings of Luighne Connacht =

Ancient Irish kings

The Kings of Luighne Connacht were rulers of the people and kingdom of Luighne Connacht, located in what is now County Mayo and County Sligo, Ireland.

The southern area was originally known as Gailenga but by the 12th-century called Sliabh Lugha. After the Anglo-Norman conquest of Connacht, it was known as the barony of Gallen, and ruled by the clan Mac Siúrtáin until the early 17th century.

The northern area, lying in south-west County Sligo, retained the name Luighne.

The families of Ó hEaghra, Ó Gadhra and Devlin of Connacht descend from rulers of the kingdoms.

== King list ==
- Taichleach mac Cenn Faeladh, d. 728/734.
- Dunghalach mac Taithleach, d. 771.
- Tuathchar mac Cobhthach, d. 846.
- Finshnechta mac Maele Corcrai, d. 879.
- Dobhailen mac Gormghus, eponym of the Ó Dobhailen clan, d. 885.
- Uathmarán mac Dobhailéin, d. 920.
- Eaghra Poprigh mac Saorghus, d. 926.
- Maol Da Bhonna mac Dobhailen and Muirchertach mac Eaghra, d. 928.
- Domhnall mac Gadhra, slain 931.
- Domnall mac Mael Muadh, d. 946.
- Diarmaid mac Uathmharan, d. 984.
- Conchobar mac Domnaill, d. 989.
- Cearnachan mac Flann, slain 1001.
- Domhnall Ua hEaghra, d. 1023
- Duarcán Ua hEaghra, tigherna of Teóra Sloinnte Luighne, d. 1059.
- Ruaidrí Ua Gadhra, rígdomna of Luigne, d. 1059.
- Dubhdhara ua Aigheannán, d. 1093.
- Taichleach Ua hEaghra, d. 1095.
- An Ua hEaghra, d. 1128.
- Murchadh Ua hEaghra, murdered 1134.
- Aodh Ua hEaghra, d. 1155.
- Ruaidhri Ua hEaghra, d. 1157.
- Bec Ua hEaghra, murdered 1183.
- Conchubhar God Ó hEaghra, fl.1207-1231 and Duarcán Ó hEaghra, d. 1225.
- Aodh Ó hEaghra, died 1234.
- Donough mac Duarcán Ó hEaghra, murdered 1237
- Diarmuid Ó hEaghra, d. 1250.
- Domhnall Ó hEaghra, d. 1266.
- Domnhall Dubh Ó hEaghra, d. 1294.
- Art na gCapall Ó hEaghra, d. 10 August 1316.
- Fearghal Ó hEaghra, fl. 1327?
- Sean Ó hEaghra, fl. 1335?
- Domhnall Cléireach Ó hEaghra, d. 1358.
- Fearghal Mór Ó hEaghra, d. 1390.
- Tadhg Ó hEaghra, d. 1420.

== Chiefs of the Name ==
- Seaán Buidhe Ó hEaghra
- Ruaidhrí Ó hEaghra
- Seaán mac Uilliam Ó hEaghra
- Oilill Ó hEaghra
- Cian Ó hEaghra
- Domhnall mac Oilill Ó hEaghra
- Tadhg mac Cian Ó hEaghra, d. 1560
- Conn mac Ruaidhri Ó hEaghra, d. 1581.
- Brian Ó hEaghra, d. 1586.
- Domhnall Ó hEaghra, d. 1586?
- Cormac mac Cian Ó hEaghra, d. 1612.
- Tadhg mac Cormac Ó hEaghra, d. 1616.
- Cormac Óg Ó hEaghra, d. 1642.

== See also ==
- Ó hEaghra Chief of the Name
