= The Dolans =

Televisions hosts and authors

The Dolans, consisting of Ken Dolan and Daria Dolan, were an American double act known for offering financial advice.

== Career ==
Ken Dolan and Daria Dolan were anchors for Dolans Unscripted on CNN. They have also written six books on personal finance and hosted several money seminars. Prior to joining CNN, the Dolans were contributors to CBS This Morning and CBS News Saturday Morning and hosted their own show on the now-defunct CNNfn. They also have sporadically hosted a nationally syndicated radio program, The Dolans on the WOR Radio Network.

The Dolans have been awarded the four-star rating for financial broadcasting excellence by Newsweek, the only four-star rating ever awarded by the magazine. They were named to the Vanity Fair Magazine Radio Hall of Fame.

They have appeared:

- as hosts of Dolans Unscripted, a weekly national television show on CNN
- as money contributors on CBS This Morning
- as money contributors on CBS News Saturday Morning
- as hosts of their own daily television show on CNBC
- as authors of six books on money matters

=== Biographies ===
Prior to her career in radio and television, Daria Dolan was vice president of a New York Stock Exchange firm. She holds an honorary doctorate in commercial sciences from St. Thomas Aquinas College in New York City and a bachelor's degree in theater arts from Webster University in St. Louis.

Prior to his career in radio and television, Ken Dolan was co-founder and vice chairman of a merchant banking firm. He began his career as an account executive at a major New York Stock Exchange firm. He also served in the United States Navy in Vietnam from 1967 to 1968 and holds a bachelor's degree in marketing from Boston College. Ken died in April 2018.
