= Gailenga =

Two related peoples and kingdoms in medieval Ireland

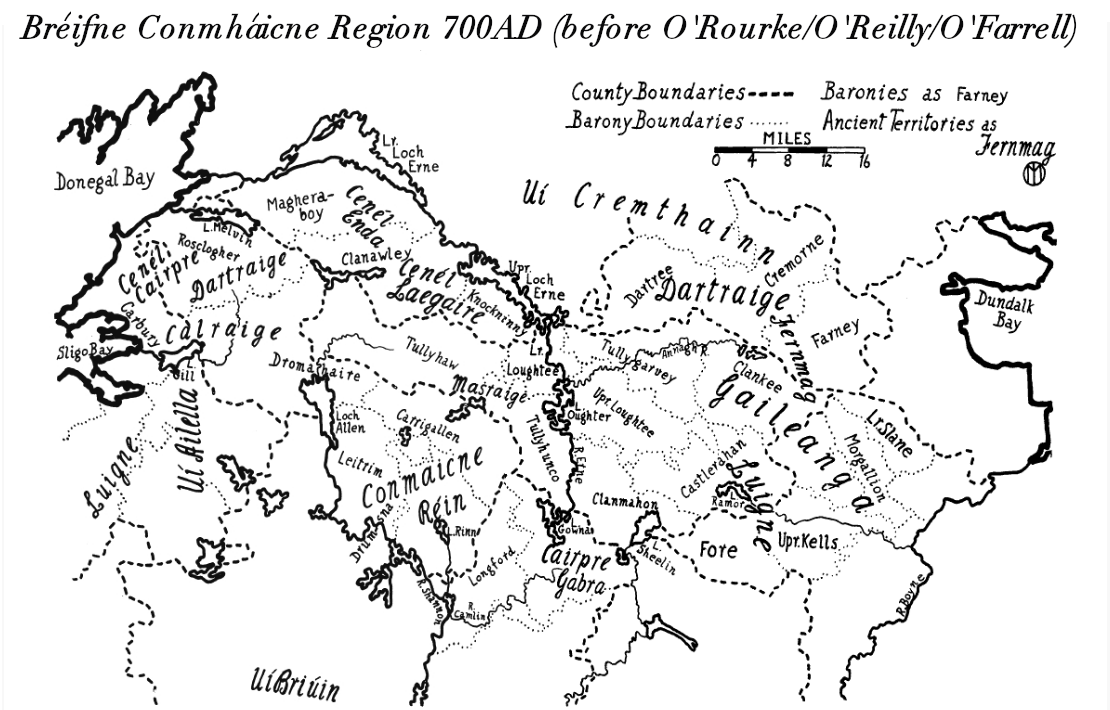
Map of Breifne c. AD 700 showing the Gaileanga in the east.

Gailenga was the name of two related peoples and kingdoms found in medieval Ireland in Brega and Connacht.

== Origins ==
Along with the Luighne, Delbhna, Saitne and Ciannachta, the Gailenga claimed descent from Tadc mac Cein mac Ailill Aulom. Francis John Byrne, in agreement with Eoin MacNeill, believes that "they were vassal tribes of fighting men whom the Connachta and Ui Neill ... planted on the lands they conquered." (IKHK, p. 69) While Byrne and MacNeill believed they originated in Connacht, recent research on the derivation of the term Connachta would indicate that they originated within Brega, and were transplanted west across the Shannon by the Connachta.

A genealogy, cited by Geoffrey Keating, states: "Tadhg son of Cian, son of Oilill Olom, had two sons, namely, Connla and Cormac Gaileang. From Iomchaidh son of Connla comes O Cearbhaill, and from Fionnachta son of Connla comes O Meachair. From Cormac Gaileang son of Tadhg, son of Cian, comes O Eadhra and O Gadhra and O Conchubhair Ciannachta. The following are the territories they acquired, namely: Gaileanga, east and west; Ciannachta, south and north; Luighne, east and west."

Rawlinson B 502 or Rawlinson B 512 contains the following genealogy:

Léocán m. Laidgneáin m. Máeláin m. Éicnich m. Dúnchada m. Cináeda m. Léocáin m. Donngaile m. Conchobair m. Moínaich m. Máel Mórda m. Adamra m. Dechraich m. Dergscáil m. Leae nó oe m. Cormaicc [Gaileang] m. Taidg m. Céin m. Ailella Auluimm.

== Conquerors of Connacht ==
Byrne goes to say that the Gailenga and Luigni were closely associated as neighbours and allies in Connacht, "situated south of the Ox Mountains they formed a large block between the northern Ui Fiachrach and the Ui Briuin. They themselves dominated smaller tribes, and have some claim to be considered an over-kingdom, as recognised in the twelfth century when their lands were absorbed into the diocese of Achonry. Their ruling families of O'Gara and O'Hara remained prominent well into the seventeenth century. The baronies of Gallen in Mayo and Leyney in Sligo, along with Corrand and Coolavin in the Curlew Mountains, lloming over the fertile plain of Moylurg, into which the Ui Briuin Ai were to expand, were crowded with small tribes, some of whom are intimately connected with the origin legends of the Connachta." (p.233)

== Kingdoms of Gailenga ==
- Gailenga Mora: located in area of County Meath north of the Blackwater and Boyne Rivers. Name is retained in the Barony of Morgallion.
- Gailenga Brega: located in what is now north County Dublin, between the river Liffey and the Saithne (Santry) people.
- Gailenga Connacht: located in the barony of Gallen, County Mayo.

Septs of the Gailenga Móra and Brega adopted the surnames Ó Lóthcháin, Ó hAonghusa, and Mac Maoláin.

== Kings of Gailenga Móra ==
All references taken from the Annals of the Four Masters, unless otherwise stated.

- 980 - Conghalach, son of Flann, lord of Gaileanga, and his son, i.e. Maelan;, killed in the Battle of Tara (Ireland).
- 990: The Sinnach Ua Leochain, lord of Gaileanga, died.
- 992: Egnech Ua Leochain, lord of Tuath-Luighne, was slain by Maelseachlainn, and Cathal, son of Labbraidh.
- 1001: Meirleachan, i.e. the son of Conn, lord of Gaileanga, and Brodubh, i.e. the son of Diarmaid, were slain by Maelseachlainn.
- 1002: Donnghal, son of Donncothaigh, lord of Gaileanga, was slain by Trotan, son of Bolgargait (or Tortan, son of Bolgargait), son of Maelmordha, lord of Feara-Cul, in his own house.
- 1005: Cathal mac Dunchadha, tigherna Gaileng Mór, was slain
- 1013: Senán ua Leocháin king of Gailenga, fell in battle in a raid by Ualgarg ua Ciardha king of Cairbre.
- 1018: Maolán mac Eccnígh Uí Leochain, tigherna Gaileng & Tuath Luicchne (Luigne) uile, do mharbhadh dona Saithnibh. (Maelán son of Éicnech ua Lorcán, king of Gailenga and all Tuatha Luigne, was killed by the Saithni.
- 1037: Laidhgnén hUa Leocáin, tigherna Gaileng.
- 1051: Laidcenn mac Maolain hUí Leocáin, tigherna Gaileng.
- 1053: Conghalach mac Senáin, tighearna Gaileng.
- 1130: Amhlaoibh mac Mic Senain, tigherna Gaileng.
- 1144: Mac Mic Maoláin, tigherna Gaileang Breagh ("the son of Mac Maoláin") was slain.

== Kings of Gailenga Brega ==
- 1076: Murchadh son of Flann Ó Maolseachlainn, was treacherously killed by Olaf son of Maelán, king of the Galenga, in the bell-house of Kells, and straightway, through a miracle of St Columcill's, Olaf himself was killed by Maolseachlainn son of Conchobhar. (Annals of Tigernach)
- 1144: Mac Mic Maoláin, tigherna Gaileang Breagh, was slain.

== Kings of Gailenga Connacht ==
- Toichleach ua Gadhra, died 964.
- Conghalach mac Laidhgnen ua Gadhra, died 993.

== See also ==
- Kings of Luighne Connacht
- Kings of Sliabh Lugha
- Cúán úa Lothcháin
