= Muimne, Luigne and Laigne =

Muimne, Luigne and Laigne, sons of Érimón by his wife Odba, were, according to medieval Irish legends and historical traditions, joint High Kings of Ireland following the death of their father. They ruled for three years, until Muimne died of plague at Cruachan, and Luigne and Laigne were killed by their cousins Ér, Orba, Ferón and Fergna, sons of Éber Finn, in the Battle of Árd Ladrann, leaving no heirs. The Lebor Gabála Érenn synchronises their reign with the last year of Mithraeus and the first two years of Tautanes as kings of Assyria (1192-1189 BC, according to Jerome's Chronicon). Geoffrey Keating dates their reign from 1272 to 1269 BC, the Annals of the Four Masters from 1684 to 1681 BC.

== See also ==
- Irish clans

Royal titles
Preceded by Érimón	High Kings of Ireland; LGE 1192–1189 BC; FFE 1272–1269 BC; AFM 1684–1681 BC	Succeeded by Ér, Orba, Ferón and Fergna
