= Gallen (barony) =

Barony in County Mayo, Ireland

Gallen Gaileanga (Irish)
- Barony
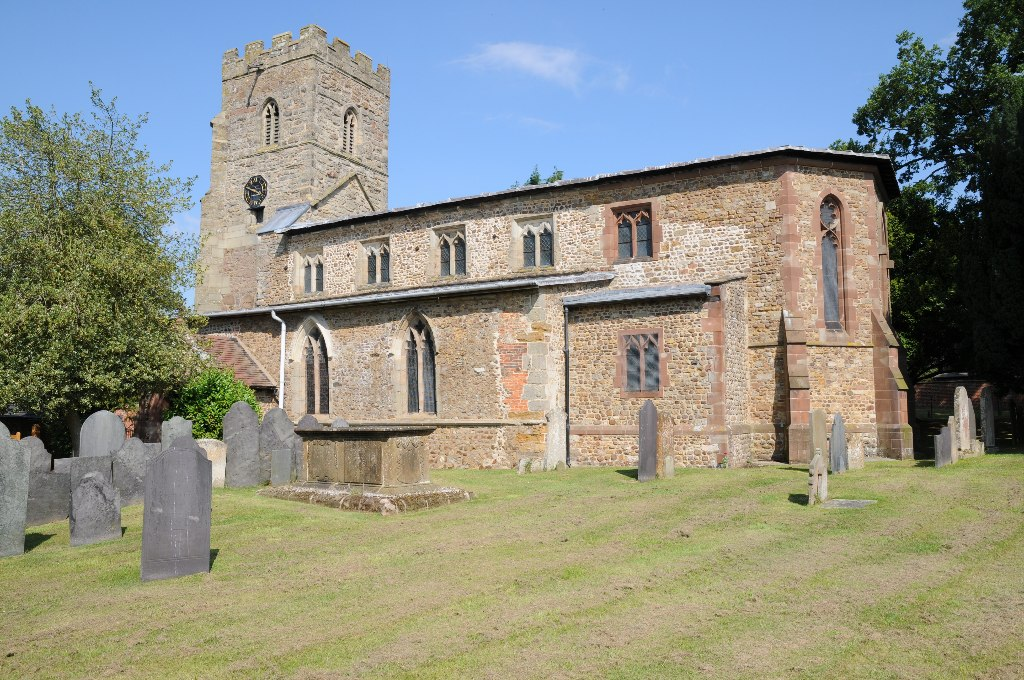
- Church in Swinford

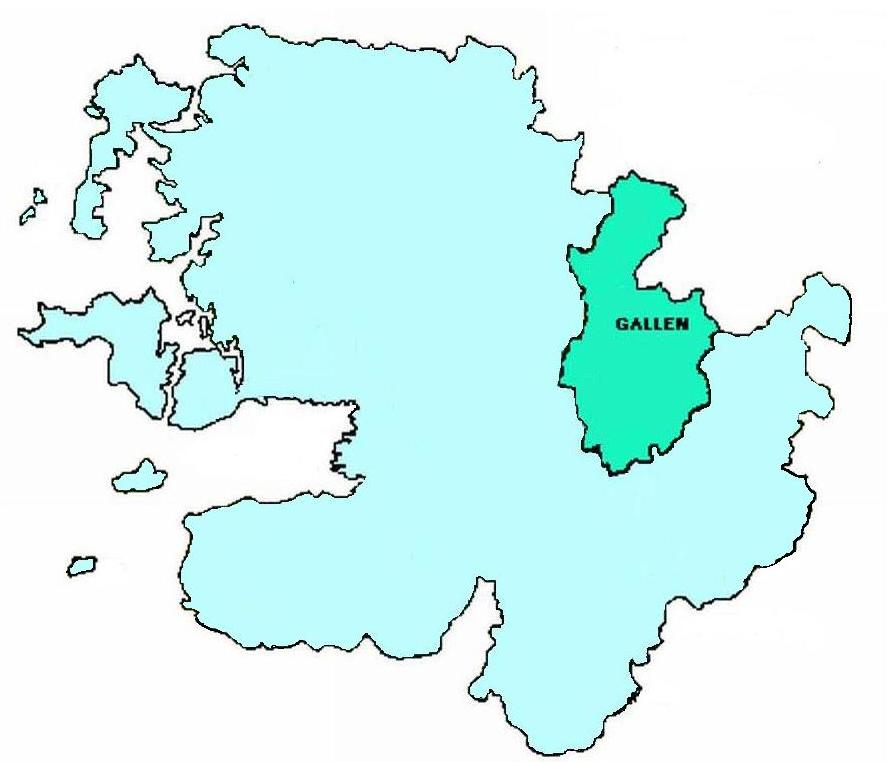
- Barony of Gallen - highlighted in the east of the county

- Location within Ireland
- Coordinates: 53°58′N 9°02′W
- Sovereign state: Ireland
- Province: Connacht
- County: Mayo

Area
  - Total: 482.2 km^{2} (186.2 sq mi)

The Barony of Gallen is one of the nine baronies in County Mayo, Ireland. It is situated in the eastern part of the county south of the town of Ballina, bordering County Sligo. It incorporates the area between Foxford (north and west), Ballyvary (southwest), Swinford (south) and Bonniconlon (east).

The descendants of Cormac Gaileng, great-grandson of Ailill Aulom were called Gailenga, the race of Gaileng, and they gave their name to the barony of Gallen in Mayo.

Viscount Dillon of Costello-Gallen, created in 1622 for Theobald Dillon, Lord President of Connaught, held the title in the Peerage of Ireland.

== See also ==
- Gailenga

== Parishes in the Barony of Gallen ==
- Toomore
- Bohola
- Attymass & Kilgarvan
- Kildacommoge
- Kilconduff Swinford
- Killedan Kiltimagh
- Meelick
- Tempelmore *Strade
- Killasser
- Midfield

== Towns in the Barony of Gallen ==
- Foxford
- Ballyvary
- Bonniconlon
- Swinford
- Kiltimagh
