= The Maid and the Palmer =

Traditional song

"The Maid and the Palmer" (a.k.a. "The Maid of Coldingham" and "The Well Below The Valley") (Roud 2335, Child ballad 21) is an English language medieval murder ballad with supernatural/religious overtones. Because of its dark lyrics (implying murder and, in some versions, incest), the song was often avoided by folk singers. Considered by scholars to be a "debased" version of a work more completely known in European sources as the Ballad of the Magdalene, the ballad was believed lost in the oral tradition in the British Isles from the time of Sir Walter Scott, who noted a fragment of it having heard it sung in the early years of the nineteenth century, until it was discovered in the repertoire of a living Irish singer, John Reilly, from whom it was collected in the 1960s, although subsequently other versions have surfaced from Ireland from the 1950s to the 1970s; an additional full text, collected and notated in around 1818, was also recently published in Emily Lyle's 1994 Scottish Ballads under the title "The Maid of Coldingham", having remained in manuscript form in the intervening time. Based on a tape of Reilly's performance provided by the collector Tom Munnelly, the singer Christy Moore popularised the song under its alternate title "The Well Below the Valley" with the Irish folk band Planxty and later solo performances/recordings, this song providing the title of that group's second album released in 1973; the song has subsequently been recorded by a number of more recent "folk revival" acts.

== Synopsis ==
A palmer (pilgrim or holy man) begs a cup from a maid who is washing at the well, so that he could drink from it since he is thirsty. She says she has none. He says that she would have, if her lover came. She swears she has never had a lover. He says that she has borne nine babies (or in different versions, other numbers such as seven or five) and tells her where she buried the bodies. She begs some penance from him. He tells her that she will be transformed into a stepping-stone for seven years, a bell-clapper for seven, and spend seven years in hell.

In some variants, the children were incestuously conceived. Also in at least one version collected in Ireland, and more so in European variants, the palmer is identified as God or Jesus.

== Commentary ==
This ballad combines themes from the Biblical stories of the Samaritan woman at the well, and Mary Magdalene. In several foreign variants, the palmer is in fact Jesus. Mary Diane McCabe, cited below, says that John Reilly was reportedly aware that the story concerned Mary Magdalene (McCabe, chapter 10, note 25, citing "A letter to me from Tom Munnelly dated 12 April 1978"), although whether this was before or following a suggestion by Munnelly is not recorded, while other sources cite Munnelly reporting that John Reilly also identified the palmer (termed "a gentleman" in his version) as Christ; another (thus far) unique, additional Irish variant collected by Munnelly from Willie A. Reilly, another traveller, specifically identifies the stranger as Christ: "Oh, for I am the Lord that rules on high / Green grows the lily-O / Oh, I am the Lord that rules on high / In the well below the valley-O" (McCabe, listed as version E, stanza 5).

A Breton variant of the song is called "Mari Kelenn" (also "Mari Gelan"; French: "Marie Quelenn" or "Gelen"); in this version, the element of meeting at the well is missing, and there is more emphasis on the penance that must be performed by the woman, plus the method of her ultimate absolution.

Child, 1882 discusses the history of this ballad in detail over 4 pages (pp. 228–232 of the printed version). By analogy with its European counterparts, it seems clear that Child 21 is a British "Magdalene ballad", although the identity of the protagonist has been lost. Mary Diane McCabe, who corresponded extensively with the Irish collector Tom Munnelly regarding this and other ballads, regarded it as such and wrote:

Though all extant versions of the British Magdalen ballad are corrupt, the song is very effective. The irony of the Magdalen's religious oath and futile attempt to deceive the palmer would be fully appreciated only if the ballad audience already know the legend of the Magdalen, or the gospel story of the Samaritan woman. The enormity of the Magdalen's crime, the relentless revelation of the burial places she had supposed secret, and the horrified exclamation on the pains of hell remain mysterious but powerful even when the medieval legend has been forgotten. The original British Magdalen ballad, like its Scandinavian counterpart, tempered justice with mercy in the Sacrament of Penance, and the medieval audience was thus both entertained and instructed.

Joseph Harris of Harvard, 1971, speculated that the evolution of the ballad followed 3 stages (his "Forms I–III"): in Form I (originating in Catalonia and the Romance region), Mary Magdalene has sinned, meets Jesus who gives her a penance of seven years in the wilderness, after which she is received in heaven; in Form II, also in Catalonia, the narrative acquires elements of the meeting of Jesus with the Samaritan woman at the well, in which the woman does not at first recognise Jesus but he surprises her with his detailed knowledge of her sins; and in his Form III, interpreted as arising in Scandinavia, the new motif of child murders is introduced (possibly from Child no. 20, "The Cruel Mother"), and it is this form that then spread through the English and Scottish, Scandinavian (with Finland), and Slavic ballad areas.

A more extensive account of the European (specifically: Finnish) counterpart/s of the song and its apparent history is contained in a 1992 thesis by Ann-Mari Häggman entitled "Magdalena på källebro : en studie i finlandsvensk vistradition med utgångspunkt i visan om Maria Magdalena" ("Magdalena at the wellspring: a study in the Finnish-Swedish song tradition based on the poem about Maria Magdalena") and in the Finnish Folklore Atlas.

Writing in 1984, David C. Fowler presents an analysis of various aspects of the ballad, suggesting that the well at which the action is located may be a derivation from Jacob's Well, scene of the biblical conversation between Jesus and the Samaritan woman, that the inclusion of the figure of the palmer (archaic by the time of Percy) lends considerable antiquity to the text, and that the "Lillumwham" and other apparent nonsense lines in the Percy version appear to be later, and highly incongruous, grafts to the original verses. He also is of the opinion—in contrast to that of other scholars, who emphasise the "redemptive" potential of the penances—that the proposed penances could actually be intended to be ironic (along the lines of "when hell freezes over", etc.), in which case redemption would likely be never attainable for the protagonist.

Within the UK/Irish versions collected, the "incest" element is most apparent in the longer version collected by Munnelly from John Reilly, in which the latter (in this version there are five murdered children) sings "Two of them by your father dear, Two more of them came by your uncle Dan, Another one by your brother John."

A different ballad "The Cruel Mother", Child ballad 20, exists in a number of variants, in some of which there are verses where the dead children tell the mother she will suffer a number of penances each lasting seven years; those verses properly belong in "The Maid and the Palmer". (see also "Notes".)

The Welsh scholar and poet Tony Conran expressed the view that the version in Percy (and thus the basis for Child's main entry) did not have the correct ring of authenticity, but was instead an "Elizabethan anti-catholic burlesque of a lost earlier version".

== Survival and publication history ==
For this ballad, Child had access to only two English text versions without tunes (although he also quotes from translations of Continental equivalents), one longer one with 15 verses stated as being from p. 461 of the Percy Manuscript dating from the mid seventeenth century, plus another fragment with 3 verses only, recalled by none other than Sir Walter Scott, the latter dating from early decades of the nineteenth century. In Percy it appears under the name "Lillumwham", a possible nonsense word that appears in Percy's (and thus Child's) interpolated refrain for each verse: (line 2:) "Lillumwham, lillumwham! (line 4:) Whatt then? what then? (lines 7–9): Grandam boy, grandam boy, heye! Leg a derry, leg a merry, met, mer, whoope, whir! Driuance, larumben, grandam boy, heye!". In an article "Songs connected with customs" published in 1915, A. G. Gilchrist, Lucy Broadwood and Frank Kidson suggested that these words may be related to the turning of a spinning wheel, while Richard Firth Green in 2004 suggested that they may relate to a ploughboy or carter's calls. In either scenario, or any other not yet suggested, when Percy's manuscript collection was transcribed by Furnivall for publication, the ballad was included (somewhat incongruously) in the latter's section comprising "Loose and Humorous Songs", accompanied by a comparison with other ballads that humorously suggest methods by which a woman who has lost her virginity might regain it by some clearly unworkable means, presumably a reference to the last verse of the Percy version: "When thou hast thy penance done / Then thoust come a mayden home."

The fragment quoted by Child originating from Sir Walter Scott does not have the "Lillumwham" nonsense-style chorus but instead had a first refrain line that Scott did not recall, followed by a second, "And I the fair maiden of Gowden-gane". Unbeknown to Child, what appears to be a complete text of possibly the same version, with the refrain "The primrose o' the wood wants a name"/"I am the fair maid of Coldingham" (lines 2/4) had been collected at a similar time by the Reverend Robert Scott, minister of the parish of Glenbuchat in Aberdeenshire, Scotland, set down about 1818, under the name "The Maid of Coldingham", however this version remained in manuscript form and was not published until almost two centuries later, first appearing in Emily Lyle's 1994 Scottish Ballads compilation (as no. 32 in that collection) and then again in 2007 in The Glenbuchat Ballads by David Buchan and James Moreira, the latter work being a full transcription of the collection made by the Reverend Scott in the early part of the nineteenth century. (Note: This collection, whose existence was previously known to some nineteenth century scholars, remained in private hands until 1949 and was never utilised (except very indirectly) by Child. The late David Buchan and latterly, his student James Moreira spent many years transcribing and annotating the contents following its deposition in the Special Collections of the Aberdeen University Library by a member of the original compiler's family.)

Unlike many other ballads that survived relatively prominently in oral tradition up to the twentieth century, this ballad appeared to be extinct in the British-Irish oral tradition until it was collected (in 2 versions, with similar words but, surprisingly, completely different tunes) by Tom Munnelly from the repertoire of the settled Irish traveller John Reilly in 1967 and 1969 (see below), under the name "The Well Below The Valley"; in Reilly's versions, the refrain is "Green grows the lily-o, right among the bushes-o", occurring after the third line of every verse which is always "...At the well below the valley-o". Munnelly transcribed the longer version where it appeared in Ceol: A Journal of Irish Music, III, No. 12 (1969), p. 66 and subsequently in B.H. Bronson's "The Traditional Tunes of the Child Ballads" (final volume, 1972). In his remarks on the song, Dr. Bronson states: "It was not to be expected that a traditional version of this ballad, which had barely survived in a fragmentary form in Scotland a century and a half ago, should have turned up in Ireland after the second world war. But such is the case, and we have word of yet another variant in the same vicinity in the year 1970...".

In fact, unknown to, and/or overlooked by both Munnelly and Bronson at the time, a "full text" of the Well Below the Valley variant had already been collected by Pádraig Ó Móráin in 1955 from Anna Ní Mháille, an old lady from Achill Island in County Mayo, with the opening verse:

There was a rider passin' by / There was a rider passing by / He askhed a drink, as he was dry / At the well below the valley, oh! / My washing tub it is afloat / Green grows the valley, oh!

(text reproduced in Anne O'Connor, "Child Murderess and Dead Child Traditions", Helsinki, 1991), (Note: Achill Island had/has a strong Ulster connection (refer separate Achill Island article), which at least suggests a possibility that this song, in either its English or Scottish earlier version(s), entered into Ireland via that route.) while a shorter set of words (combined with the refrain from a separate song) had also been recorded, again in Ireland, by Seamus Ennis in 1954 from a different singer, Thomas Moran, and released (unrecognised since it was under a different title) on LP by Caedmon in 1961 (refer "Recordings").

Subsequent to his recording(s) of John Reilly, Munnelly also encountered versions of the song from two other travellers in different locations (all sharing the surname Reilly and possibly distantly related), as described further in the "Recordings" section, while a separate Irish revival singer and songwriter, Liam Weldon, recorded a partial version in the 1970s stated to have come from one Mary Duke, possibly also a traveller (additional discussion also below). Julia Power, a settled traveller resident in Dublin, also recalled the line "at the well down in the valley" (but no more) as part of a song, as recorded in Dublin in 2015–2016.

McCabe's thesis, pp. 392–396, also lists over 30 variants (labelled C.M.1 through C.M.32) of Child no. 20, "The Cruel Mother", in which either the seven year penances, or reference to being a porter in hell, occur, apparently as borrowings from the present ballad, comprising 12 from Scotland, 2 originally from Ireland (the informants in these cases then residing in England and the U.S.A.), 6 from Canada, and 12 from the U.S.A.

Despite its rarity in Britain, the ballad appears to have been popular and widely distributed elsewhere in Europe, in particular in the Finland/Sweden area, where—in the form known as "Mataleena" or "Magdalena på Källebro", clearly related to the figure of Mary Magdalen—a large number of performances have been documented. Although no complete version has been found in the United States, John Jacob Niles in his publication The Ballad Book reproduces three stanzas stated to have been collected in 1932 from a child in the Holcomb family in Kentucky, about nine years old, who "got the verses from an uncle", the first of which reads "Seven long years you shall atone / Derry leggo derry don / Your body be a steppingstone / Derry leggo derry downie" and which he identifies as a fragment of the present ballad, under the title that he assigns to it, "Seven Years", however it should also be noted that some more recent authors do not accept all of Niles' statements regarding ballads (or portions thereof) that he claimed to have discovered, especially in Kentucky, that have been reported by no-one else. (Note: Mary Diane McCabe devotes a whole chapter (chapter 10) to "The Maid and the Palmer" in her 1980 University of Durham thesis A critical study of some traditional religious ballads (available at http://etheses.dur.ac.uk/7804/1/7804_4801.PDF) and is among those who discounts Niles' claim to have discovered a fragment of this ballad in Kentucky, although without any specific reasoning given in this case.)

== Recordings ==
=== Traditional (source) singers ===
The Irish song collector Tom Munnelly was instrumental in popularising the song (under the title "The Well Below The Valley") in the 1970s folk revival, having heard it sung by John Reilly in County Roscommon in 1963. He recorded at least two versions from Reilly; the shorter version of the two, with ten verses, was released on Reilly's posthumous Topic LP The Bonny Green Tree (1978), also re-released on volume 3 of the 1998 Topic "Voice of the People" series, O'er His Grave the Grass Grew Green – Tragic Ballads. Prior to the official release of his Reilly recordings, Munnelly played his tape to (among others) Christy Moore who then used it as the title track to the 1973 "Planxty" album of the same name (see below). A more extensive, 1969 recording from Reilly (16 verses) exists in the tape collection of D. K. Wilgus, and can be heard via this youtube release. Earlier, in 1954, the song collector Seamus Ennis recorded singer Thomas Moran of Mohill, Co. Leitrim singing a partial version (6 verses only); in Moran's version (available for listening here) the refrain (lines 2 and 4 of each verse) appears to belong to a previous Child Ballad (number 20, "The Cruel Mother") but the remainder of the text is that of the present song. Mis-titled "The Cruel Mother", Moran's version was actually released earlier than Reilly's, on the 1961 Caedmon release The Folk Songs of Britain, Vol. IV: The Child Ballads 1 (TC1145), re-released under the same title as Topic 12T160 (1968). (Note: The "creep" of some verses of the present song into some versions Child number 20 was noted by Child himself, who gives such stanzas in his versions J and L of "The Cruel Mother", along with the comment: "the story is the same [as versions already given] down to the termination, where, instead of simple hell-fire, there are various seven-year penances, properly belonging to the ballad 'The Maid and the Palmer'..." (Child, notes to "The Cruel Mother", p. 218 of printed volume).)

Subsequent to hearing and recording the version/s by John Reilly, Tom Munnelly taped additional versions of the song (as "The Well Below The Valley") from two other singers in Ireland, a Willie A. Reilly aged 35 near Clones, Co. Monaghan in 1972, and a Martin Reilly aged 73 in Sligo, Co. Sligo in 1973; both were travellers and possibly related, but distantly, to John Reilly of Boyle. (Listed as M.P. [=Maid and Palmer] versions E and F in Mary Diane McCabe's 1980 thesis, pp. 391–392, based on copies of tapes supplied by Munnelly). The same author notes yet another version obtained by Irish revival singer Liam Weldon, stated as being "as learned from the singing of Mary Duke (a traveller?)"; Weldon is described elsewhere as having "a lifelong interest in the songs of the Irish Travelers". As performed by Weldon, Mary Duke's is only a partial version, comprising the initial encounter at the well between the protagonist and the "man riding by" but none of the subsequent revelations of child murders and associated penances.

=== Revival singers ===
- The Irish folk band Planxty (with vocals by Christy Moore) released a version, based closely on Reilly's, on their album The Well Below the Valley (1973).
- Liam Weldon recorded his version, based on the singing of Mary Duke, on his 1976 Mulligan LP Dark Horse on the Wind (refer additional description above).
- Steeleye Span recorded it on the album Live at Last (1978).
- The folk-rock group Pyewackett played a version on their second album The Man in the Moon Drinks Claret (1982).
- The folk band Brass Monkey recorded a version for their eponymous debut album (1983), using the melody of "From Night Till Morn.
- A version of Well Below The Valley can also be found on Christy Moore's live album At The Point Live (1994).
- The wedding sequence that opens the film The Magdalene Sisters (2002) features a rendition of this song performed by Sean Mackin.
- The paganfolk band Omnia released a version of the song called 'The Well', on their album PaganFolk (2006).
- Stiff Little Fingers frontman Jake Burns recorded a version on his solo album Drinkin' Again (2006).
- The Celtic fusion/Neofolk artist Sharon Knight recorded a version called 'Well Below the Valley' on her album Neofolk Romantique (2013).
- Polly Paulusma recorded it on her 2021 album "Invisible Music : The Folk Songs That Influenced Angela Carter”
- Being a well-documented song publicised by Mudcat, and Mainly Norfolk, the song was recorded by Jon Boden and Oli Steadman for inclusion in their respective lists of daily folk songs "A Folk Song a Day" and "365 Days Of Folk".

== See also ==
- List of the Child Ballads
- John Reilly (singer) (article includes an additional note regarding this song)
- Mari Kelenn
