= John Reilly (singer) =

Irish singer (1926–1969)

Background information
- Born: 1926; Carrick-on-Shannon, County Leitrim, Ireland
- Died: 1969 (aged 42–43) Boyle, Ireland
- Genres: Traditional Irish
- Occupations: Tinsmith, traveller, singer

John "Jacko" Reilly, (1926–1969) (Note: The same sources that give his birth year as 1926 also give his age at death as 44 in 1969. Either one or the other of these values is obviously in error by one year but it is not clear which.) was a traditional Irish singer. He was a settled Irish Traveller who lived in Boyle, County Roscommon, but hailed originally from Carrick-on-Shannon, County Leitrim. He was a profound influence on many popular folk and traditional singers, based largely on recordings of his singing by the Irish song collector Tom Munnelly, which were not released until after his death in 1969.

== Biography ==
Reilly was born at Carrick-on-Shannon, County Leitrim in 1926 to an Irish Traveller family that included seven sisters and a brother. His parents were both singers and passed on much of their repertoire to him. The family travelled the roads of Leitrim, Sligo and Roscommon where after the manner of the times, the travellers would thatch, sweep chimneys, and do various odd jobs. They also assisted with haymaking or harvesting on farms, although Reilly was frequently passed over in favour of stronger-looking workers on account of his slight build and relatively frail appearance. He developed a personal preference for, and skill at, tinsmithing. During the Second World War, Reilly moved with his family to Belfast, as it was easier to get tin in the North than the South at that time, and other provisions were also more easily obtainable. In 1953, he returned to Carrick-On-Shannon.

Reilly's mother and father died when he was young and he was left to raise his siblings on his own. In 1962 he took up residence in Boyle, County Roscommon, where he remained for the rest of his life. In Boyle he repaired bread tins for Egan's Bakery on Green Street, and also sold buckets and billycans which he had made. Although there was general prejudice against Travellers in many places at that time, he seems to have been well treated and respected in Boyle. One resident in particular, a publican called Mrs Grehan, took an interest in Reilly's welfare and sometimes gave him meals in her kitchen, where he also became known by Mrs Grehan's young daughters (who later became an established folk act in Ireland and the United Kingdom, as The Grehan Sisters). By the mid-1960s, Reilly was living in reduced circumstances in a derelict house on Green Street and was not feeding himself well, which had a deleterious effect on his already poor health.

In 1964, the Irish song collector Tom Munnelly heard Reilly singing at a Fleadh (Irish music festival) in Boyle. The following year, when Munnelly was collecting music as a sideline from his regular job, he travelled to Boyle to record Reilly for the first time (these recordings did not survive). Munnelly was amazed at the store of traditional ballads and other songs that Reilly knew and would sing for anyone who asked, including a version of "The Maid and the Palmer" (Child ballad 21), which Reilly called "The Well Below the Valley", that had not been collected in the oral tradition for 150 years, as well as others infrequently noted in Ireland. (Note: B.H. Bronson includes 2 versions of "The Well Below the Valley", both notated from Reilly, in the 1972 final (volume 4) part of his monumental work "The Traditional Tunes of the Child Ballads" (Princeton University Press). In his remarks on the song, Dr. Bronson states: "It was not to be expected that a traditional version of this ballad, which had barely survived in a fragmentary form in Scotland a century and a half ago, should have turned up in Ireland after the second world war. But such is the case, and we have word of yet another variant in the same vicinity in the year 1970...". In notes to the song's re-release on Topic's "Voice of the People Volume 3", the writer notes: "In this unique and mystical ballad we find John Reilly, surely one of society’s most maltreated members, sharing a jewel of unprecedented beauty with us all.") Munnelly recorded Reilly singing for a second time in Grehan's Pub in Boyle in 1966 on "a machine which left a lot to be desired", and again in 1967 both in Boyle and in a pub in the village of Gurteen, County Sligo, where Reilly was visiting; that same year he took Reilly to Dublin for a short holiday during which time he sang for an audience at The Tradition Club in Capel Street, although other clubs in Dublin at that time would not give the floor to genuine traditional singers. Reilly later told Munnelly that this brief stay in Dublin was "one of the happiest periods in his life". In 1969, D. K. Wilgus, a professor of folksong in the University of California Los Angeles, visited Ireland and was told by Munnelly of Reilly and that same weekend the two set off for Boyle to record him. Recording equipment was set up in the back room of Grehan's pub and between Saturday night and Sunday morning Reilly recorded about 36 songs and ballads for them (elsewhere, Munnelly remarked to his friend Patrick Carroll during a 1973 collecting trip that Reilly probably had a "repertoire at between two and three hundred songs, mainly ballads"). Unfortunately, Reilly was suffering from a cold and his regular friend, Mrs Grehan, was away in hospital for three months undergoing a hip operation so was unable to look after him. When Munnelly and Wilgus returned to Boyle a few weeks later hoping to find Reilly in better health, they found him in a very poor state in his derelict house having had no food for several days and suffering from pneumonia. After failing to revive his spirits in a bar, Munnelly drove him first to a doctor and then to Roscommon Hospital where he was treated but discharged after a few days, however a week later, and after Munnelly had departed, Reilly collapsed in the streets of Boyle and was taken to the Boyle Cottage Hospital, where he died soon after, aged only 44.

A set of 18 Reilly tracks recorded by Munnelly was released (without Munnelly's permission) on cassette on the "Folktrax" label in 1975, followed in 1978 by 14 Munnelly recordings officially released as "The Bonny Green Tree: Songs of an Irish Traveller" by Topic Records in 1978. Other recordings of John's singing are held in the Folklore Section of University College Dublin and The University of North Carolina, U.S.A. as part of the Professor D.K. Wilgus Collection.

Munnelly played a tape of Reilly singing "The Well Below the Valley" to the Irish singer Christy Moore who subsequently performed it on Planxty's album The Well Below the Valley. Moore also recorded "The Raggle Taggle Gypsy", first on Prosperous and then again with Planxty on their first album: Planxty, again sourced from Munnelly's recordings of Reilly. Sinéad O'Connor later recorded Reilly's "Lord Baker" as a duet with Moore on her 2002 album Sean-Nos Nua, but with amended words and music. Moore has also gone on to sing "Green Grows The Laurel" (aka "The Captain") as well as "What Put The Blood" and "Tippin it Up" from Reilly's repertoire, and has hinted he may yet do others.

Moore had in fact already encountered Reilly during visits to Grehan's pub in the mid-1960s, where the presence of the singing Grehan sisters was a drawcard for young, male would-be singers of Moore's generation. Moore's friend and travelling companion Davoc Rynne wrote of them hearing Reilly for the first time:

(At Grehan's pub, the following night) The woman of the house called for "Silence for the singer" and this little man cleared his throat nervously and began to sing. Stillness descended upon the room as he sang "There were Three Old Gypsies Came to our Hall Door" and on he went. We were a bunch of crazy youngsters out for fun but we all knew we were hearing something special. He looked like a man in his 60s but he was, in fact, only in his early 40s. He had lived a very hard life and neither his living conditions nor his diet would have been adequate. I guess he was 5 foot 7 inches or so and was of slight build. He loved a few pints of porter and also loved to smoke tobacco. He was very friendly and shy and he loved to sing. He was in awe of the fact that people simply loved listening to him. For most of his life he would not have received much attention. Apart from his wonderful songs what I remember most is that he was a simple and beautiful man and he had the "smell of the fire" about him. He wore an old army longcoat and a well worn cap.

Older residents of Boyle remember Reilly as a basically shy, kind-hearted man; in his liner notes to "The Bonny Green Tree", Munnelly wrote:

John Reilly was indeed a gentleman. Shy but social, fond of his pint but not addicted to it. A man who did not read or write but who was one of the most learned men to grace the roads of Ireland. John Reilly now lies with his mother in an un-marked grave in the cemetery of Ballaghadereen. But he has here a memorial more fitting than stone. The songs he loved and which were part of the very fabric of his existence still live on, and even if posthumously, they are now reaching a larger audience than ever before.

A plaque commemorating John Reilly was unveiled outside Grehan's old pub in 2014 by the Grehan Sisters (Francis, Marie & Helen). The proceeds of a concert given by Christy Moore and the Grehan Sisters in Boyle in 2014 financed the erection of the plaque for John Reilly. In October 2018, both John Reilly and Tom Munnelly (who died in 2007) were posthumously inducted into the Irish Traditional Music Hall of Fame at the RTÉ Radio 1 Folk Awards.

== Discography ==
- John Reilly: The Rosin Box: John Reilly – sings Irish Tinker Ballads (Folktrax cassette FTX-175, 1975). Tracks: The Braes of Strathblane / The Rosin Box (The Jolly Tinker) / Johnny Reilly / The Raggle Taggle Gypsy-O / The Dark Eyed Gypsy-O / What Put The Blood (Edward) / The Mountain Stream / The Woman of our Town (Marrowbones) / Mary, the Pride of Cluainkeen / Johnston's Motor Car / Peter Heaney / At the Foot of Newry Mountain / Claddogh (Claudy) Banks / Seven Nights Drunk / A Lady in her Father's Garden / Paddy McAnulty (Old Carathee) / The Bold Sea Captain (Two Loyal Lovers) / Here's Adieu to all Truelovers
- John Reilly: The Bonny Green Tree (Topic TSDL 359, 1978). Tracks: Adieu Unto All True Lovers / The Raggle Taggle Gypsy / The Well Below the Valley / Tippin' it up to Nancy / Lord Baker / Old Caravee / The Bonny Green Tree / Once There Lived a Captain / Peter Heany / What Put the Blood? / Rozzin Box / The Braes of Strawblane / One Morning I Rambled from Glasgow / The Pride of Cloonkeen
- Various artists: Songs of the Irish Travellers (Pavee Point PPCD004, c. 2008). – John Reilly sings "John Reilly" and "Newry Mountain". (Reissue of European Ethnic Oral Traditions: Songs of the Irish Travellers, cassette, 1983).

Several tracks from The Bonny Green Tree are included on the 1998 Topic "Voice of the People" compilation series, as follows:

- Volume 3: O'er His Grave the Grass Grew Green – Tragic Ballads (Topic TSCD 653) – John Reilly sings "The Well Below the Valley".
- Volume 7: First I'm Going To Sing You a Ditty – Rural Fun & Frolics – John Reilly sings "The Rosin Box"
- Volume 10: Who's That at my Bedroom Window? – Songs of Love & Amorous Encounters – John Reilly sings "Adieu To All true Lovers"
- Volume 15: As Me and My Love Sat Courting – Songs of Love, Courtship & Marriage – John Reilly sings "Old Carathee"
- Volume 17: It Fell on a Day, a Bonny Summer Day – Ballads – John Reilly sings "Lord Baker" and "Once There Lived a Captain"

== See also ==
- Traditional Irish Singers
- Irish Traveller
- Tom Munnelly
- Christy Moore
