= The Grehan Sisters =

- The Grehan Sisters in 1966 - from cover of their REX EP. Left to right: Francie (age 20), Bernie (16), Marie (21).

Background information
- Origin: Boyle, County Roscommon, Ireland
- Genre: Irish folk
- Years active: 1964–1970 approx.
- Labels: REX (Decca), Transatlantic
- Past members: Marie Grehan; Francie Grehan; Helen "Bernie" Grehan

The Grehan Sisters were an Irish folk music act of the mid to late 1960s who achieved popularity in Britain after moving to Manchester, England in 1967 from their native Boyle in County Roscommon, via a spell performing in Dublin. They disbanded around 1970 but have occasionally reunited for one-off appearances in subsequent years, most recently in 2015, while Helen (formerly "Bernie") continues to perform intermittently as a solo artist.

== Biography ==
Siblings Marie, Francie and Helen (then known as Bernadette or "Bernie") Grehan were immersed in Irish traditional music from an early age via their parents' pub, Grehan's in Boyle, and as teenagers developed a reputation for their exuberant renditions of traditional and composed Irish songs and tunes, also featuring Francie's playing on mandolin and mandolin-banjo, Helen on guitar and both Helen and Marie on spoons, with which they frequently entertained the patrons. Young up-and-coming singers such as Christy Moore were attracted by their energy and their talents; in his 2012 book "One Voice" Moore wrote:

The pub would rock when the Grehan Sisters - Francie, Marie and Bernie - let fly with 'Leaning o'er the Half Door' or 'Tippin' It Up to Nancy'. We often travelled up from Kildare to hear these women sing, for they melted our hearts with the wildness of their playing and the raw gusto of their three voices, and we fell in love with them... We met up with the Grehan Sisters again in London when we were all trying to break into the circuit. They gave me support slots and contacts and both the band and their manager Mike Thornley were generous with transport, floor space, mighty dinners and much appreciated friendship.

In around 1965 the sisters moved to Dublin to develop their playing and singing career, where they were included in The Dubliners' (at the time unfinished) short musical/comedy film O'Donoghue's Opera, and in 1966 released a single "Patsy McCann"/"Woman Of Our Town" plus an EP The Grehan Sisters for Rex records, a subsidiary of Decca. In 1967 they signed to the London-based Transatlantic Records, who were keen to capitalise on their recent success with releases of the Dubliners by signing another Irish group, and moved to Manchester, England where they established themselves on the U.K. folk scene, typically performing "with gusto" in the style of the day also favoured by artists such as The Dubliners and The Clancy Brothers. In the U.K. they released an LP On the Galtymore Mountains (1967) featuring a mix of traditional music and Irish rebel songs, at which time Marie was 23 years old, Francie 22 and Helen 18. They released two more singles, this time on Transatlantic, and contributed two newly recorded songs to a 1968 Transatlantic sampler Here's To The Irish. They were a popular attraction on the British Folk Club circuit and the major urban concert venues, and were regular guests on the UK radio show "Country meets Folk", appearing ten times in 1968 and 1969.

From the 1970s onwards the sisters ceased touring as an act and eventually all three returned to Ireland to live; Helen took part in several RTÉ productions and radio broadcasts in the 1980s. The three have reunited on occasion for special performances. In 2014 the Grehan Sisters and Christy Moore headlined a tribute concert in Boyle to the late John Reilly, a traditional singer associated for some years with their parents' pub, and in 2015 they were guests of honour and recipients of the Annie McNulty Award at the opening of the South Roscommon Singers Festival, while Helen continues to perform intermittently as a solo artist featuring her own songs.

Marie died on 25 November 2020.

== Discography ==
- Various artists: Fleá Ceoil. Gael-Linn CEF 013, 1964(?). The Grehan Sisters (as Na deirfiúracha Grehan agus Fergus Cahill) sing "The Nightingale" and play "The High Reel" with Fergus Cahill; they also accompany Cahill on "Enniskillen Dragoons". Recorded live at the Fleá Ceoil festival, 1964, in Clones, Co. Monaghan, Ireland. The album is undated but is usually assigned to 1964 (although some sources have 1965 or 1966); releases either side in the Gael-Linn catalogue are CEF 012 (1962) and CEF 014 (1967).
- The Grehan Sisters perform one song "Off to Dublin in the Green" in the film O'Donoghue's Opera, 1965, also featuring The Dubliners, Johnny Moynihan, and others.
- "Patsy McCann"/"Woman Of Our Town". REX R. 11020 (single), 1966.
- The Grehan Sisters. REX (Decca) EPR 5005 (EP), 1966. Tracks: The Half Door; The Good Man (As I Came Home); Ould Ballymoe; Medley: The Old Bush/The Congress.
- On the Galtymore Mountains. Transatlantic TRA160 (LP), 1967. Tracks: Victoria; On the Galtymore Mountains; Jigs: Gallagher's Frolics/Leitrim Jig; The Lake of Coolfin; The Fairy Boy; The Black Velvet Band; Lonely Banna Strand; My Uncle's in the Dail; Tommy McDonagh; The Donegal Reel; The Wexford Massacre. With Packie Byrne, whistle.
- "Save the Old Home"/"Victoria". Transatlantic TRASP-14, 1967 (single)
- Various artists: Here's To The Irish. Transatlantic TRA-SAM-1, 1968. The Grehan sisters sing "Henry Joy" and "The Orange and the Green", both previously unreleased. These tracks subsequently available on various other compilations.
- "Cricklewood"/"God Bless The Irish". Transatlantic TRASP-20, 1968 (single)
- Various artists: Here's To The Irish Volume 2. Transatlantic TRA-SAM-11, 1969. The Grehan sisters sing "Cricklewood" (as per the 1968 single release) and "Victoria" (from their 1967 album).
- Seamus Tansey and others: Traditional Music from Sligo, Outlet SOLP 1022, 1973. Bernie (as "Bernadette") Grehan plays guitar alongside Seamus Tansey - flute; Joe Sheridan - accordion and Bernadette Sheridan - bodhran. Tracks: Pipe On The Hob / Leitrim Jig; The Road To Boyle / The Happy Couple; Michael Coleman's / Mrs Kinney's; Across The Shannon / Mist In The Glen; Grehan's / The Movin' Bogs; The Blackbird; Lord Mayo; The Long Note; The Green Groves Of Erin / The Fox Hunter; The Hills Of Kesh / A Walk In The Country; Frieze Britches; Lark In The Morning; Port Na Bpucai; Si Bheag Si Mhor / Sonny's Mazurka; The Hills Of Clogher.

The Grehan Sisters' track "The Black Velvet Band" also appears on the 2004 Sweeney's Men 2-CD compilation The Legend of Sweeney's Men - Anthology. (Castle Music).

Although the original LP and EP/singles releases have not been reissued as such, many tracks from their Transatlantic output have been reissued in the CD era on "Various Artists" compilations under such titles as The Best of Irish Folk, Essential Irish Folk, The Wild Rover, Irish Folk Favourites, The Very Best of Irish Folk, The Irish Folk Collection, etc., as well as the Transatlantic Folk Box Set, and are therefore not hard to find.
