= Emily Lyle =

Scottish ballad scholar and researcher

- Born: 19 December 1932 (age 93); Glasgow, Scotland
- Occupations: academic, author
- Known for: research into Scottish ballads

Academic background
- Education: University of St Andrews; University of Glasgow
- Thesis: A Study of Thomas the Rhymer and Tam Lin in Literature and Tradition (1967)

Emily Lyle (born 19 December 1932 in Glasgow) is a Scottish ballad scholar and senior research fellow in the School of Celtic and Scottish Studies at the University of Edinburgh.

== Biography ==
Emily Lyle grew up in Kilbarchan, Renfrewshire, Scotland. She studied English language and literature at the University of St Andrews (MA 1954), followed by an education course at the University of Glasgow (Diploma in Education, 1955).

For six years she taught English in secondary schools in Britain and New Zealand before she was appointed as a lecturer in English at Ripon College of Education in Yorkshire (1961–65). While employed as a senior lecturer in English at Neville’s Cross College in Durham (1965–68), she wrote her doctoral dissertation "A Study of Thomas the Rhymer and Tam Lin in Literature and Tradition" (1967) at the Institute of Folk-Life Studies at the University of Leeds. Moving away from the teaching of English literature, she soon established herself in the field of Scottish studies.

== Academic career ==
In 1970, in connection with a major editorial and research project on The Greig-Duncan Folk Song Collection, she was appointed as a research fellow (1970-1995) at the School of Scottish Studies of the University of Edinburgh, and as a lecturer from 1995 to 1998.

In 1976-77, she went to Australia as a visiting fellow at the Australian National University. There she collected oral material from those with Scottish connections, some of which is included in the CD “Chokit on a Tattie” (focusing on children’s songs and rhymes), and in the journal Tocher. In 1977, Lyle donated copies of her tape recordings to the National Library of Australia. The work she did as a Fellow of the Radcliffe Institute of Harvard University in 1974-75 gave her increased visibility as a ballad scholar and led to many more visits to Harvard, including an appointment at the Center for the Study of World Religions in 1995.

In 1978 she was visiting professor of folklore at the University of California at Los Angeles; from 1979-1982 she was a visiting lecturer in folklife studies at the University of Stirling. Since 1998 she has been an honorary fellow in the School of Celtic and Scottish Studies at Edinburgh.

== Honours ==
- The Folklore Society's Coote Lake Research Medal (1987)
- The Royal Society of Edinburgh's Henry Duncan Prize Lecture awarded for contributions to Scottish culture (1997)
- Fellow of the Association for Scottish Literary Studies
- Honorary Life Member of the Traditional Music and Song Association of Scotland
- The Saltire Society/National Library of Scotland's Research Book of the Year Prize for 2003, jointly with Katherine Campbell, for Volume 8 of The Greig-Duncan Folk Song Collection
- Recipient of the Festschrift Emily Lyle: The Persistent Scholar
- The Hamish Henderson Award for Services to Traditional Music at the Scots Trad Music Awards, 2013.

== Selected publications ==
=== Books ===
- Andrew Crawfurd’s Collection of Ballads and Songs, ed. 2 vols. Edinburgh: Scottish Text Society, 1975, 1996.
- Ballad Studies, ed. Cambridge: D.S. Brewer Ltd., Folklore Society Mistletoe Series; and Rowman and Littlefield, Totowa, N.J., 1976.
- The Greig-Duncan Folk Song Collection, ed. with others. 8 vols. Aberdeen: Aberdeen University Press, and Edinburgh: Mercat Press, 1981-2002.
- Scottish Ballads, ed. Edinburgh: Canongate, 1994; Barnes and Noble, New York, 1995.
- The Song Repertoire of Amelia and Jane Harris, ed. jointly with Anne Dhu McLucas and Kaye McAlpine. Edinburgh: Scottish Text Society, 2002.
- Fairies and Folk: Approaches to the Scottish Ballad Tradition. B•A•S•E (Ballads and Songs – Engagements) 1. Trier: WVT Wissenschaftlicher Verlag Trier, 2007.
- Ten Gods: A New Approach to Defining the Mythological Structures of the Indo-Europeans. Newcastle upon Tyne: Cambridge Scholars Publishers, 2012.
- Robert Burns and the Discovery and Re-Creation of Scottish Song (joint with Katherine Campbell). Musica Scotica Historical Studies of Scottish Music, IV. Glasgow: Musica Scotica Trust. 2020.

=== Articles ===
- "Songs from South-West Scotland, 1825-1830: Motherwell's Personal Records in Relation to Records in Crawfurd’s Collection." Singing the Nations: Herder's Legacy. Eds. Dace Bula and Sigrid Rieuwerts. B•A•S•I•S (Ballads and Songs – International Studies) 4. Trier: WVT Wissenschaftlicher Verlag Trier, 2008. 188-98.
- "The Gest of Robyn Hode" (text and headnote). The Chepman and Millar Prints. Ed. Sally Mapstone. Edinburgh: National Library of Scotland and Scottish Text Society, 2008. DVD.
- and Katherine Campbell. "The Perfect Fusion of Words and Music: The Achievement of Robert Burns." Musica Scotica: 800 Years of Scottish Music. Proceedings from the 2005 and 2006 Conferences. Ed. Kenneth Elliott, et al. Glasgow: Musica Scotica Trust Publications, 2008. 19-27.
- "Three Notes on 'King Orphius'." Scottish Literary Review 1 (2009): 51-68.
- "Robert Burns: Man with a Mission." The Folklore Historian 26 (2009): 3-18.
- "The Tale of the Bold Braband in The Complaynt of Scotland." Review of Scottish Culture 22 (2010): 196-201.
- "'Robin Hood in Barnsdale Stood': A New Window on the Gest and Its Precursors." Child’s Children: Ballad Study and Its Legacies ed. Joseph Harris and Barbara Hillers. B•A•S•I•S (Ballads and Songs – International Studies). Trier: Wissenschaftlicher Verlag Trier, 2012. 71-96.
- "Genre: Ballad." The Edinburgh Companion to Scottish Traditional Literatures. Eds. Sarah M. Dunnigan and Suzanne Gilbert. Edinburgh: Edinburgh University Press (forthcoming).

== See also ==
- Lotte Motz
- Hilda Ellis Davidson
- Bertha Phillpotts
- Jacqueline Simpson
- Marija Gimbutas
- Elena Efimovna Kuzmina
