= Boyle, County Roscommon =

Town in County Roscommon, Ireland

Boyle Mainistir na Búille
- Town
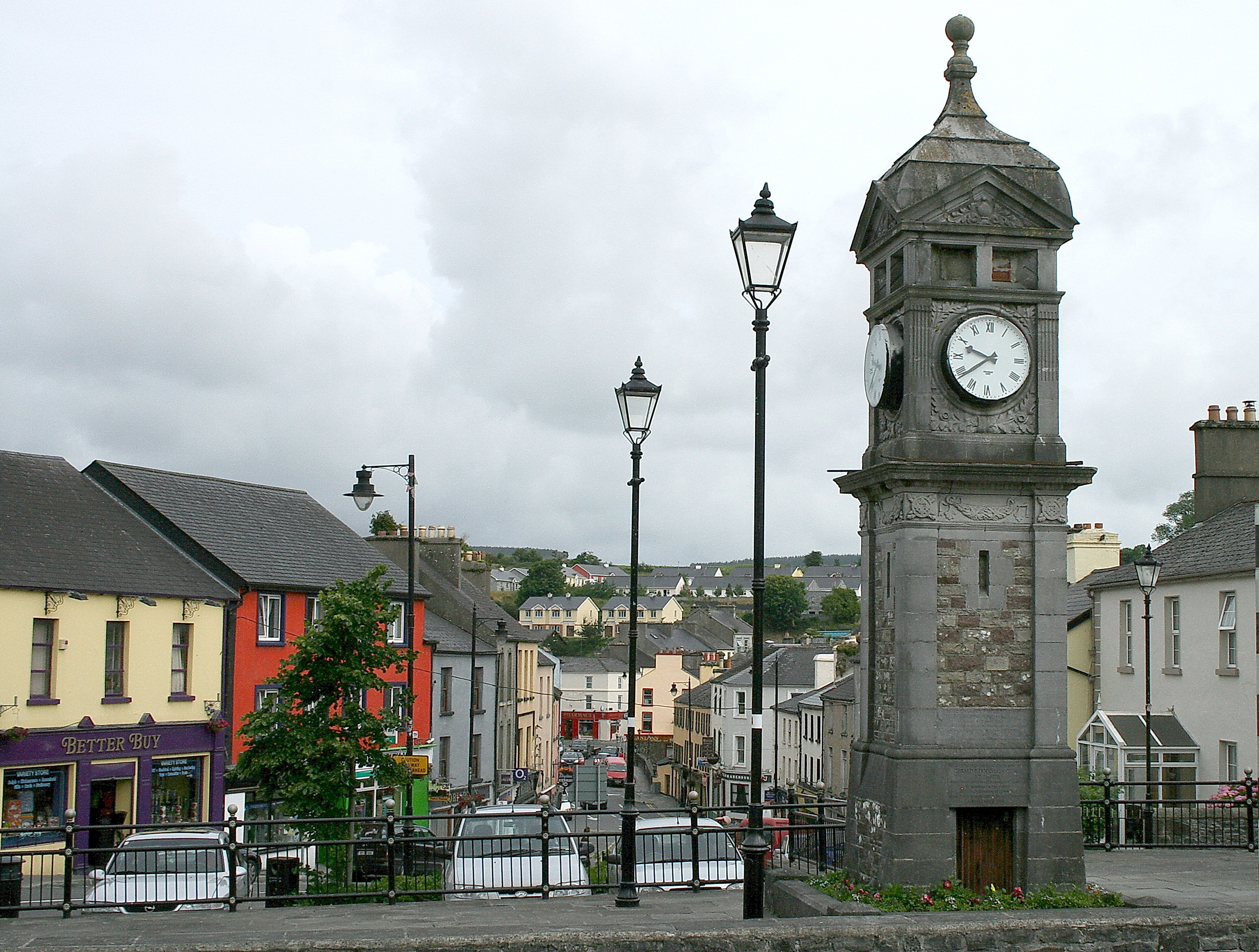
- Market Square

- Location in Ireland
- Coordinates: 53.973°N 8.301°W
- Country: Ireland
- Province: Connacht
- County: County Roscommon

Government
  - Dáil constituency: Sligo–Leitrim
  - EU Parliament: Midlands–North-West
- Elevation: 83 m (272 ft)

Population (2022)
  - Total: 2,915
- Time zone: UTC±0 (WET)
  - Summer (DST): UTC+1 (IST)
- Eircode routing key: F52
- Telephone area code: +353(0)71
- Irish Grid Reference: G797019

Historical population
Year	Pop.	±%
1813	2,272	—
1821	3,407	+50.0%
1831	3,433	+0.8%
1841	3,235	−5.8%
1851	2,727	−15.7%
1861	3,098	+13.6%
1871	3,347	+8.0%
1881	2,994	−10.5%
1891	2,464	−17.7%
1901	2,477	+0.5%
1911	2,691	+8.6%
1926	2,323	−13.7%
1936	1,727	−25.7%
1946	2,071	+19.9%
1951	1,934	−6.6%
1956	1,835	−5.1%
1961	1,739	−5.2%
1966	1,789	+2.9%
1971	1,939	+8.4%
1981	2,252	+16.1%
1986	2,383	+5.8%
1991	2,197	−7.8%
1996	2,222	+1.1%
2002	2,205	−0.8%
2006	2,522	+14.4%
2011	2,588	+2.6%
2016	2,568	−0.8%
2022	2,915	+13.5%

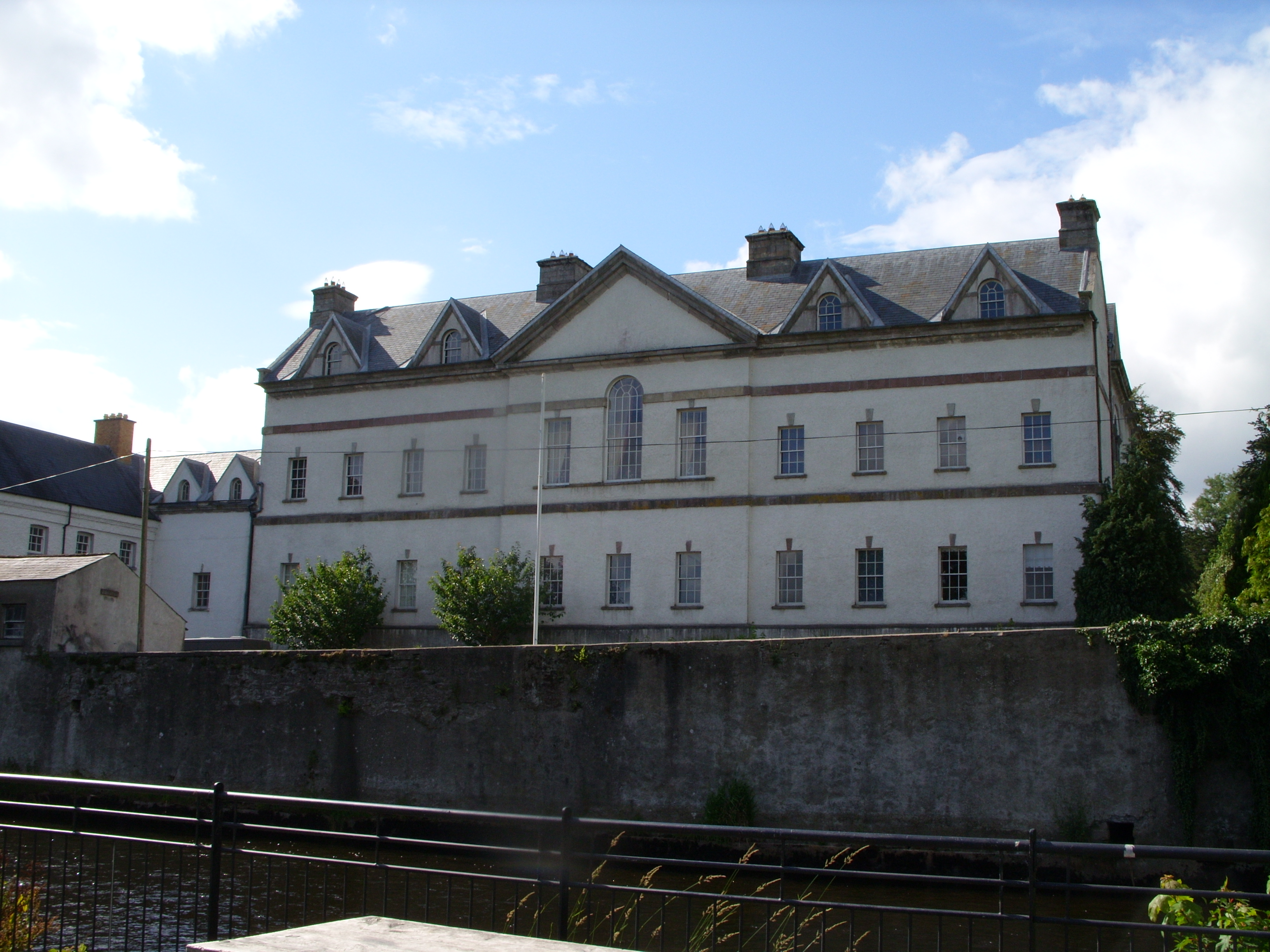
King House - viewing from Pleasure Grounds (Town Park), Boyle

Boyle (/ˈbɔɪl/; Irish: Mainistir na Búille) is a town in County Roscommon, Ireland. It lies on the Boyle River, between Lough Gara and Lough Key, at the foot of the Curlew Mountains. Carrowkeel Megalithic Cemetery and the Drumanone Dolmen are also close by. As of 2022, the population of the town was 2,915. The town is in a civil parish of the same name and in the barony of Boyle.

== History ==
=== Early history ===
On 15 August 1599, the Battle of Curlew Pass between English and Irish forces was fought in the Curlew mountains during the Nine Years' War, between an English force under Sir Conyers Clifford and a native Irish force led by Aodh Ruadh Ó Domhnaill (Red Hugh O'Donnell). The English were ambushed and routed while marching through a pass in the Curlew Mountains, with the English forces suffering heavy casualties. Losses by allied Irish forces were not recorded. The Queen's principal secretary, Sir Robert Cecil, rated this defeat (and the simultaneous defeat of Harrington in Wicklow) as the two heaviest blows suffered by the English in Ireland.

Boyle suffered hardship during the famine years (1847–49). The following quote from the novel Woodbrook is one example: A retired herd, Mick Maxwell, speaking to Thompson about his grandfather during the famine, related the following: 'when his grandfather, the only man strong enough, brought fifty and sixty corpses on a barrow, one by one, two miles from Cootehall near his home to the graveyard at Ardcarne'.

=== 19th century ===
In 1859, Fraser's Ireland described Boyle as including a "sessions-house [courthouse], hospitals, schools, the houses and offices for the agents of the Lorton Estate, the police barracks, Church, Methodist chapel, public garden". The entry also noted the "preservation of the fine ruins of the Abbey of Boyle, one of the most interesting of all our ecclesiastical structures", and that the town was "one of the principal towns of County Roscommon, and carries on a considerable retail trade in the supply of necessaries for the surrounding district".

By 1881 Slater's directory reported the town had a dispensary, three banks, three hotels and two newspapers. Boyle also had a post office, 40 grocery shops, 25 pubs (sixteen of which were also groceries), 12 bakeries and an assortment of businesses including fire insurance companies, booksellers, ironmongers and hardware stores, butchers, an auctioneer and churches for both Protestants and Catholics.

=== 20th century ===
In 1917, Sinn Féin won their first ever seat in parliament for the constituency of Roscommon North, centred on Boyle, with the election of George Noble Plunkett. Plunkett's son, Joseph Mary Plunkett, had been executed by the British in May 1916 for his association with the 1916 Rising. Michael Collins campaigned on the candidate's behalf, as did Michael O'Flanagan, later to become President of Sinn Féin. A plaque on the courthouse, on The Crescent in Boyle, commemorates this. This was the first by-election following the Easter Rising of 1916 and it was crucial that the democratic mandate be obtained by Sinn Féin.

== Landmarks ==
=== King House ===
King House is an early Georgian mansion located in the centre of the town and was restored in 1989 after some years of neglect, including surviving potential demolition for a car park. The house was built for Sir Henry King (d. 1839) MP, 3rd. Lord Kingston, between 1720 and 1740, whose family were one of the wealthiest in Ireland. It was subsequently home to Edward King, 1st Earl of Kingston. The design is attributed to William Halfpenny (d. 1755) who was an assistant to Edward Lovett Pearce.

The large U-shaped house may incorporate walls from an earlier 17th century house which was burnt. It is unusual in Ireland for the 'big house' to be located in the town, as most houses are situated in a demesne. It is also unusual for the floors to be vaulted. Perhaps, according to Rev. Daniel Beaufort, this is a response to the earlier fire.

Since 1810, when the King family moved to Rockingham, the house had been used as a military barracks. Throughout the 19th century, it was the home of the Connaught Rangers, adapted as a barracks for twelve officers and 260 soldiers. On the foundation of the Irish Free State in 1922, the newly formed Irish National Army took possession of the house and it was renamed Dockery Barracks in honour of a commanding officer killed in Boyle during the Civil War. Part of the building remains in use by the military.

Roscommon County Council purchased the building in 1987 and began a restoration project in 1989. Using artisans and local craftsmen who employed traditional techniques and materials, the three floors and basement were restored. Included in the restoration were the main entrance gallery with its tripartite windows and original fireplace, the vaulted ceilings on all floors, and the main salon which is in use as a venue for recitals and banquets. The other rooms in the house are used for temporary exhibitions and these are open to visitors. In "The Kings of Connaught" exhibition, visitors are led through a series of tableaux. The displays cover four main themes: The Kingdom of Connaught - from the earliest recorded times showing the importance of the clans and their kings; The King Family - meet the families who lived in the house from Sir John King who came to Boyle in 1603 to the accounts of life, both for the family and the staff, at Rockingham Estate (now Lough Key Forest Park); The Restoration - a room left partially restored so that visitors can see the fabric of the house. The basement of the building is home to the Boyle branch of the county library service and separately houses the old jails as part of the King house visitor experience.

=== Boyle Abbey ===
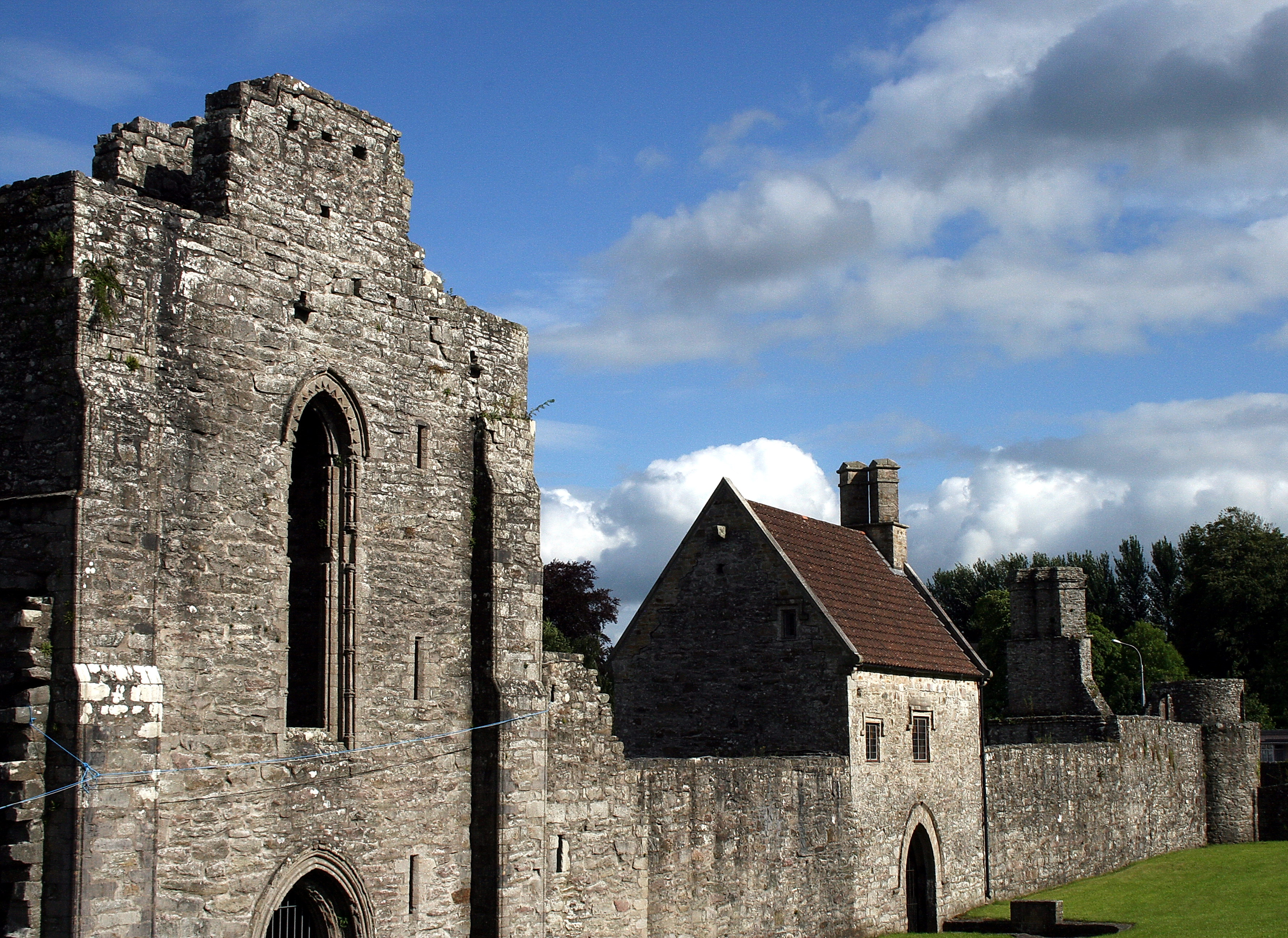
Boyle Abbey - restored gatehouse, centre

The Cistercian abbey was founded in the 12th century under the patronage of the local ruling family, the MacDermotts and is one of the best preserved in Ireland. It was colonised from Mellifont in 1161. The building of the chancel and the transepts with their side-chapels probably began shortly after this date, though the lancet windows in the east gable were inserted in the 13th century.

There is a combination of rounded and pointed arches in the transepts and crossing. The existing large square tower formed part of the church from the beginning, though it was raised in height at a later stage. The five eastern arches of the nave and their supporting pillars were built at the end of the 12th century, and have well-preserved capitals typical of the period. Although built at the same time, the arches of the northern side of the nave are different in type and have differently shaped columns and capitals. The three westernmost arches in the south arcade which have leafed and figured capitals were built after 1205, as was the west wall before the church was finally consecrated in 1218.

Nothing remains of the cloister, but on the eastern side, there are two doorways of c.1200, now blocked up. On the west side, there is a two-storey gatehouse, which acts as an interpretative centre. The rest of the buildings surrounding the cloister are largely 16th or 17th century. The Abbey was one of the most important in Connacht, and was invaded by Richard de Burgo, Maurice Fitzgerald, and Justiciar, in 1235. In 1659, the Cromwellians occupied the monastery and did a great deal of destruction. Though damaged during the 17th and 18th centuries when it was used to accommodate a military garrison, Boyle Abbey is one of the best preserved structures of its type, and attracts thousands of visitors per year. A restored gatehouse 16th/17th century vintage houses an exhibition. The Abbey is now a national monument in state care.

There is a Sheela na gig hidden above one of the central Romanesque arches. It can be seen from ground level, just at the top of the column, where the arch begins.

=== Lough Key Forest Park ===
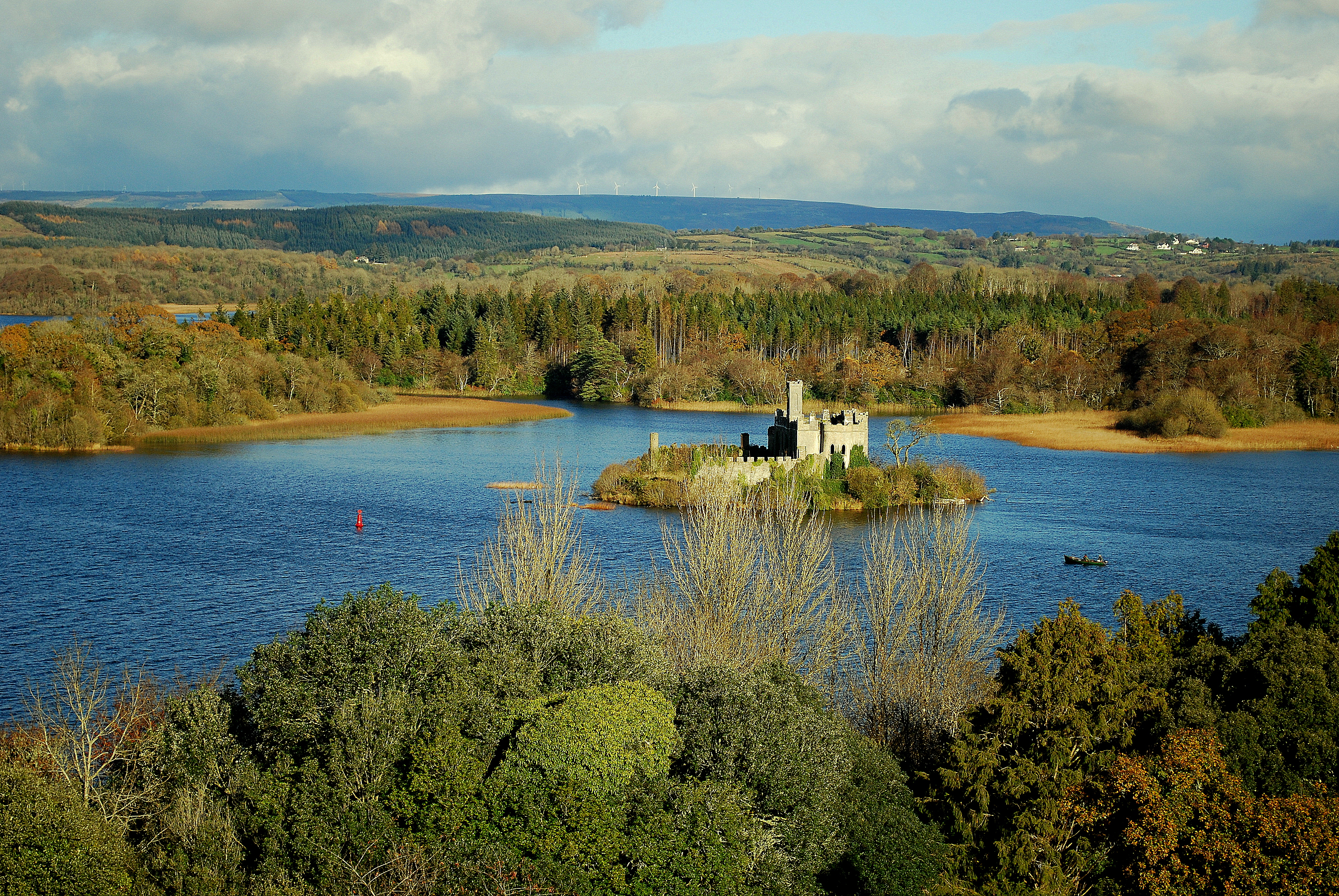
Castle Island, Lough Key

Situated off the N4 is Lough Key Forest Park, a parkland area that has a visitor centre and activity facilities, including Boda Borg, a puzzle solving activity centre which is a Swedish concept originally unique to Sweden but now has locations in Ireland and the United States. The park covers 800 acres (3.2 km^{2}), and was formerly part of the Rockingham estate. This was the seat of the Stafford-King-Harman family who at the end of the nineteenth century held over 30,000 acres (120 km^{2}) in north County Roscommon and County Sligo. Rockingham House was designed by John Nash in the early 19th century for the English landlord John King. It had a domed front and 365 windows.

Rockingham House was suspiciously destroyed by fire in 1957, after which it was taken over by the Irish Land Commission. Declared as unsafe in 1970, it was demolished. The tunnels to Rockingham House are still accessible to this day. A viewing tower was built in 1973. In the town park, known locally as the Pleasure Grounds behind King House stood a statue of William of Orange. This was pulled down and destroyed by locals in 1945, though the base of the statue remains.

There are several islands on Lough Key. Castle Island is among the better known islands, while Trinity Island contains the ruins of a chapel, linked to the Cistercian monastery in the town. There are two trees growing on the island with interlinked branches, said to mark the graves of Una Bhan Mac Diarmid and Tomás Láidir Mac Coisdealbhaigh, two ill-fated lovers, celebrated in the poem Una Bhan.

=== Other places of interest ===
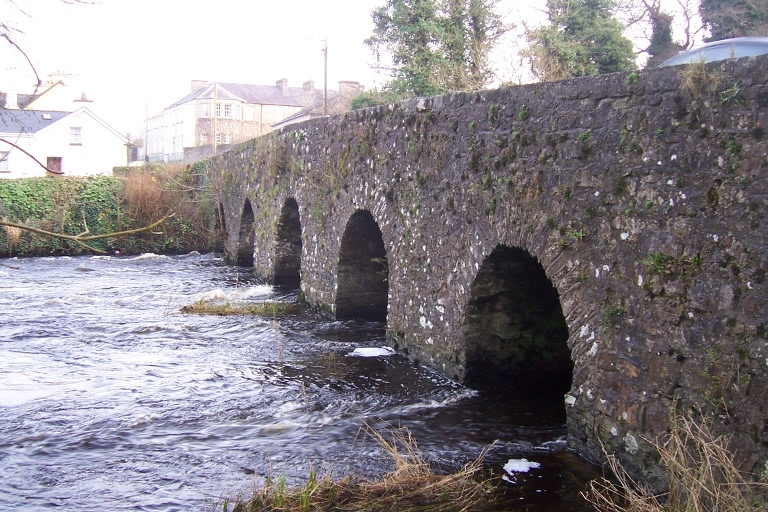
Abbeytown bridge, dated to the 12th Century

Abbeytown bridge is a five-arch stone bridge across the Boyle River close to the abbey. Originally built in the late 12th Century, it is one of the oldest surviving stone bridges in Ireland. It has been widened but still carries a 5-ton load.

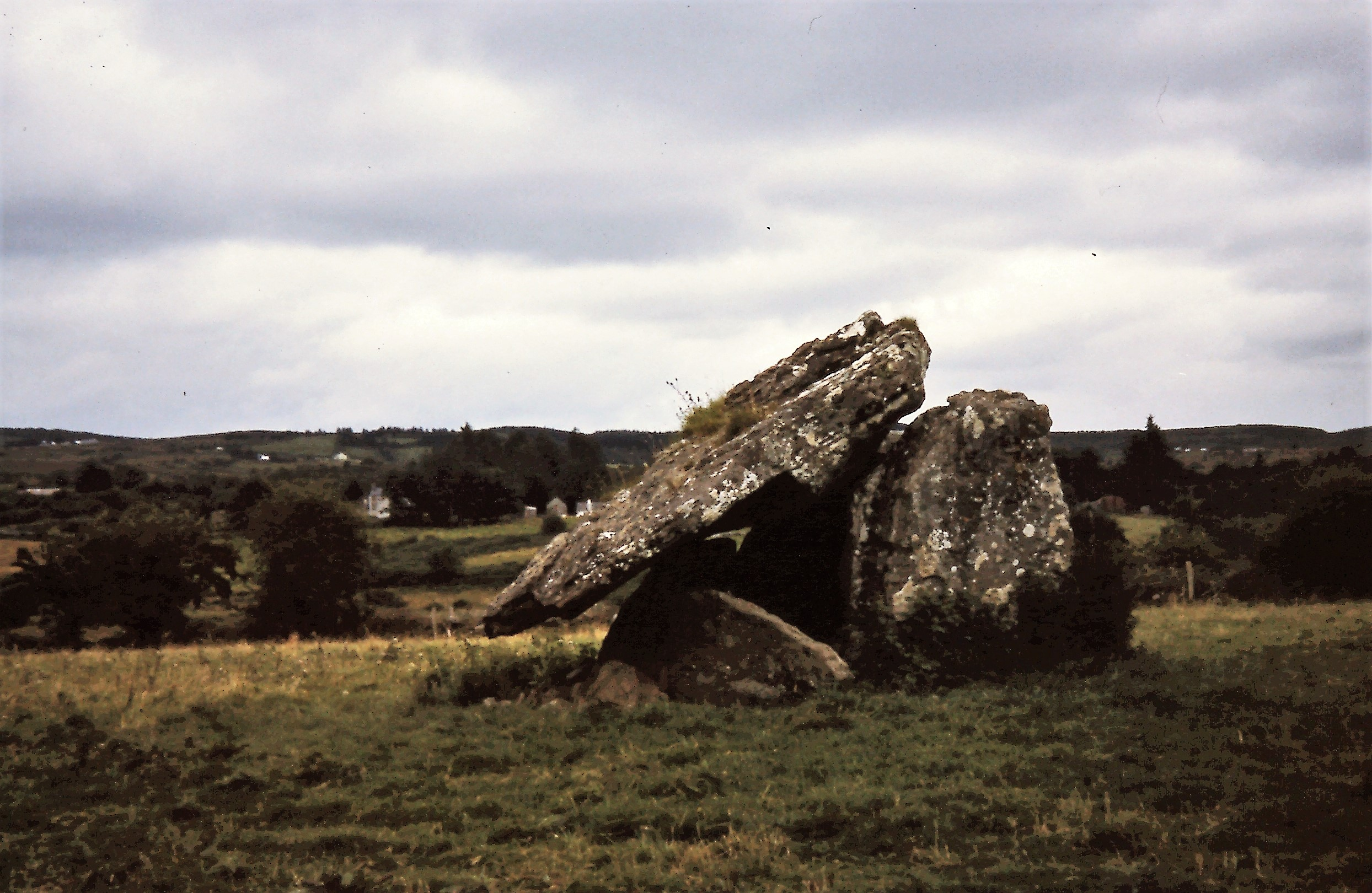
Drumanone Dolmen

The Drumanone dolmen (portal tomb) is just west of the town. It is a site of Irish and European historic archaeological significance. This Dolmen located outside Boyle, is an example of a portal dolmen and was built before 2000 BC. The capstone of the tomb, 4.5m x 3m wide, is one of the largest to be seen in Ireland. Drumanone Dolmen has portal stones more than 2m high and a doorstone about 2m high. The capstone is about 4m square and has slipped back to cover the polygonal chamber. The sides of the chamber are each composed of a single stone. It is located in pasture land approximately 300m north of the Boyle River. Excavations showed charcoal with bone fragments and a small, polished axe-head.

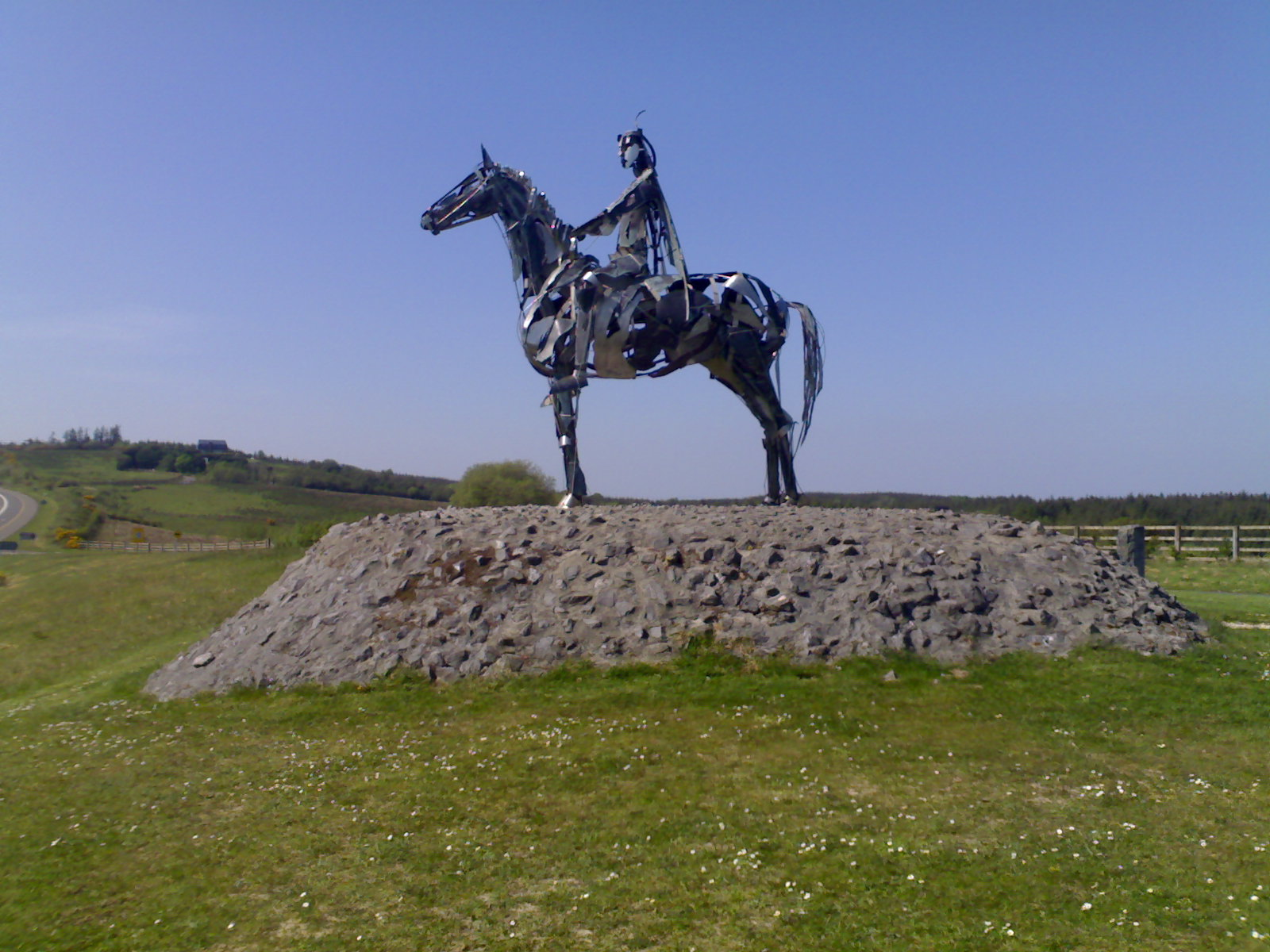
The Gaelic Chieftain sculpture

The 'Gaelic Chieftain' is a large sculpture overlooking the Curlew Pass just outside Boyle town, and commemorates the Battle of Curlew Pass.

== Transport ==
Boyle railway station opened on 3 December 1862. Boyle lies on the railway line from Dublin to Sligo, and the N4 Dublin-Sligo main road skirts the town. The town is linked to the River Shannon navigation system via the Boyle canal, the Boyle River and Lough Key. The town was once on the N4 national primary road from Dublin to Sligo but was bypassed in 1999. It is connected to the N4 by the R294 regional road (which also connects it to Ballina, County Mayo) and the N61 national secondary road which links Boyle to Athlone via Roscommon.

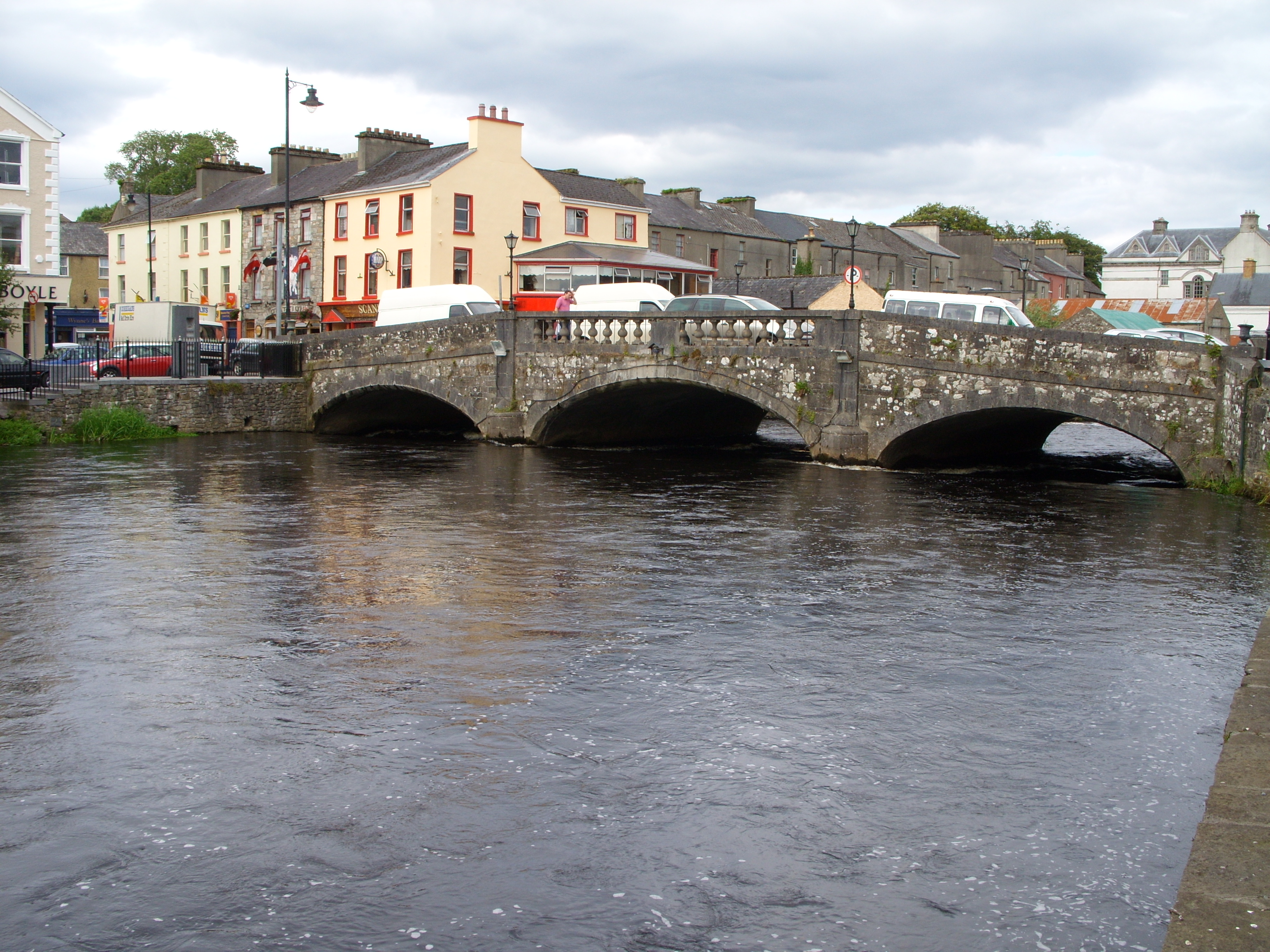
Boyle River Bridge

Boyle has a Locallink bus service to Roscommon three times daily.

== Local government ==
Boyle was previously administered by town commissioners. After becoming a town council in 2002, and in common with all other town councils in Ireland, it was abolished under the Local Government Reform Act 2014. At the 2019 Roscommon County Council election, Boyle and its surrounding area formed a six-seat local electoral area.

== Notable people ==
- Michael Bowles (1909–1998), orchestral conductor, grew up in Boyle
- John Carty, Irish traditional musician, has lived in Boyle since 2003
- Patrick Chapman, writer
- Margaret Cousins (1878–1954), suffragette and women's rights campaigner
- Robert Cryan (1827–1881), physician
- The Grehan Sisters, Irish folk music group, performed a concert with Christy Moore in tribute to John Reilly in 2014
- John McGahern, writer, grew up near Boyle and the town is mentioned in several of his books. In his novel The Dark, a scene is played out in the dining room of the former Royal Hotel, overlooking the river.
- Caitlín Ní Thoirbheird (1891–1969), Conradh na Gaeilge activist and Irish language educator in the early 20th century, spent her life in Boyle
- Chris O'Dowd, actor and comedian, born in Boyle. O'Dowd filmed segments of his comedy Moone Boy in the town during 2012 and 2013.
- Maureen O'Sullivan (1911–1998), actress, born in Boyle
- John Reilly (1926–1969), singer, lived in Boyle, credited by Christy Moore as a source of several well-known folk standards

== Arts festival ==
Boyle Arts Festival is a summer event and has been held since 1990 - with the 2016 event billed as the 27th festival. Events include an art exhibition of works by contemporary Irish artists, classical and traditional music, poetry, drama, lectures and children's events.

== See also ==
- List of towns and villages in Ireland
- Market Houses in Ireland
