= Caitlín Ní Thoirbheird =

Activist and Irish language educator

- Born: Catherine Turbitt; 5 May 1891; Boyle
- Died: 24 July 1969 (aged 78); Boyle
- Other name: Cassie Turbitt
- Known for: Teacher and activist

Caitlín Ní Thoirbheird (5 May 1891 – 24 July 1969) was a Conradh na Gaeilge activist and Irish language educator.

== Biography ==
Ní Thoirbheird was born in Boyle in 1891. Her parents were James Turbitt, a coach-maker, and Mary Gahan. She was one of seven living children. Ní Thoirbheird was known in the family as Cassie and only she and her sister Áine spoke Irish. Ní Thoirbheird worked as a travelling teacher in and around Lurgan and Mountmellick in 1915.

Ní Thoirbheird worked for Conradh na Gaeilge. She was appointed assistant organiser in Roscommon in 1918 and then county secretary in 1920. She was also appointed travelling teacher for Roscommon County Council from 1923 but continued to work for the Gaelic League. She was employed full time as a teacher of Irish by the County Roscommon Vocational Education Committee. Ní Thoirbheird retired on 30 June 1957. She died in 1969, and is buried in Assylin Cemetery.
