= Lotte Motz =

Austrian-American scholar

- Born: Lotte Edlis; 16 August 1922; Austria
- Died: 24 December 1997 (aged 75)
- Writing career
- Genres: Mythology, Folklore

Lotte Motz, born Lotte Edlis (16 August 1922 – 24 December 1997), was an Austrian-American scholar, obtaining a Ph.D. in German and philology, who published four books and many scholarly papers, primarily in the fields of Germanic mythology and folklore.

== Life ==
Lotte Motz's family left Austria in 1941, following the Anschluss. She earned her B.A. from Hunter College and pursued her graduate studies at Stanford University and the University of Wisconsin, obtaining a Ph.D. in German and philology from the latter institution in 1955. She later earned a D.Phil. at the University of Oxford in Old English. Motz obtained an academic position in the German language department at Brooklyn College and also taught at Hunter College. After she retired from teaching due to illness in 1984, Motz's research interests came to focus on female figures in Germanic mythology, especially the nature and function of giantesses.

According to Rudolf Simek, Motz was "never afraid to attack the icons of scholarship if she believed the truth to be elsewhere," noting that:

[Motz] was thus the first scholar in recent history to question the truth behind the goddess Nerthus in Tacitus' Germania, the name being only one of several possible manuscript readings, thus opening up new paths of thought on early Germanic religion. Lotte Motz was certainly the first scholar in our field to take a serious step past the Three-Function-Theory developed by Georges Dumezil nearly four decades ago."

== Reception of Motz's scholarship ==
Jenny Jochens cites six of Motz's titles in the bibliography to her Old Norse Images of Women, and Andy Orchard cites sixteen of Motz's works in endnotes to entries in his Dictionary of Norse Myth and Legend. Motz's research into the role of giants in Northern mythology has been cited by several scholars. Her inquiries into the nature of dwarfs in myth and folklore have also been widely influential.

Motz's early essay on the Eddic poem, Svipdagsmál summarizes previous theories concerning the origin of the work and advanced a novel interpretation of the hero Svipdag's journey to Menglöð's hall. Motz proposed that the poem described an initiatory ritual into a mother goddess cult. As one of few commentaries on the poem, Motz' interpretation of the poem was cited by Christopher Abram, (2006). and while John McKinnell noted that Motz "makes some telling points," in her analysis, agreeing with Motz that the word aptr indicating that Menglöð welcomes Svipdag "back" should not be excised without justification. McKinnell disagreed with Motz's thesis, stating: "[t]here is no need to identify Menglöð with Gróa, and the attempt to see Gróa's spells as an initiatory ritual distorts the obvious meanings of several of them."

Margaret Clunies Ross disagrees with the conclusions of a series of articles Motz published in the 1980s, arguing that "the giants represent a group of older deities, pushed into the background of Viking Age consciousness by peoples' changing patterns of worship," describing Motz's argument as "introduc[ing] an element of speculation into our understanding of Norse myth for which there is no textual or other evidence" while noting the possibility that the ancient beliefs "may have allowed for the classification of more beings in the giant category in some traditions, particularly regional, Norwegian ones, than in that version of Norse mythology that Snorri Sturluson in particular handed down to us". Elsewhere in the same volume, Clunies Ross cites Motz as being the first to recognize that the dwarfs of Norse mythology "were an all-male group," an insight that Clunies Ross cites in support for her own theory of "negative reciprocity."

Regarding the relationship between the Æsir and Vanir, linguist Theo Vennemann comments,

“The Vanir are commonly presented as deities of fertility and wealth. This may be correct to a degree, but it is not a complete, or even adequate, description of the Vanir. In this critique I am in agreement with Lotte Motz (1976). Motz, too, stresses the fact that the Vanir are, like the Æsir, a complete divine family with a wide range of functions, and also the fact that the Æsir have a stronger affinity to agriculture, the Vanir to navigation ... She accounts for this difference by assuming that it arose within Germanic as a function of different invasion routes – over land to Denmark, by ship to Sweden and Norway – and of different substrates.”

Jens Peter Schjødt, associate professor in the Department for the Study of Religion at the University of Aarhus, Denmark, observes:

"Motz more or less turned the Indo-European theory upside down and argued that common traits between the Indo-Europeans and the Mediterranean world are due to borrowings from the latter cultures, and that such traits were carried with the wandering Indo-European tribes to the North from the cultures of the Mediterranean. In a rather strange way the author takes up the old historicist models of especially Karl Helm (1913) and Ernst A. Phillipsson (1953). She thus proposes that the division between the Æsir and Vanir is due to two different peoples arriving in Scandinavia (Motz 1996, 103–24). Although there are interesting ideas in the book it fails to make a convincing case for a historicist solution to be more plausible than the structuralist one of Dumézil, primarily because it does not take into consideration the overwhelming amount of comparative arguments which the French scholar brought forth from all over the Indo-European world, supporting, for instance, the proposition that the relationship between the two groups of gods is one of the basic strucral features of Indo-European mythology. As opposed to most other books on the subject in recent years, Motz is thus occupied which reconstructions of origins, which is, of course, quite legitimate, but she does it in a way that may be held rather old-fashioned."

Motz was posthumously honored with a conference held in her memory at Bonn University in 1999. This workshop resulted in the publication of a commemorative volume of eleven scholarly works in German and English concerning female entities in Northern mythology.

== Publications ==
- 1973a. "New Thoughts on Dwarf-Names in Old Icelandic", Frühmittelalterliche Studien 7:100–117.
- 1973b. "Withdrawal and Return: A Ritual Pattern in the Grettis Saga", Arkiv för nordisk filologi 88:91–110.
- 1973/1974. "Of Elves and Dwarfs", Arv 29/30:93–127.
- 1975. "The King and the Goddess: An Interpretation of Svipdagsmal", Arkiv för nordisk filologi 90:133–150.
- 1976. "Burg-Berg, Burrow-Barrow", Indogermanische Forschungen 81:204–220.
- 1977. "The Craftsman in the Mound", Folklore 88:46–60.
- 1979. "Driving Out the Elves: A Euphemism and a Theme of Folklore", Frühmittelalterliche Studien 13:439–441.
- 1979–1980. "The Rulers of The Mountain: A Study of the Giants of the Old Icelandic Texts", Mankind Quarterly 20: 393–416.
- 1980a. "Old Icelandic Völva: A New Derivation", Indogermanische Forschungen 85:196–206.
- 1980b. "Sister in the Cave: The Stature and the Function of the Female Figures of the Eddas", Arkiv för nordisk filologi 95:168–182.
- 1981a. "Gerðr: A New Interpretation of the Lay of Skirnir", Maal og Minne 121–136.
- 1981b. "Giantesses and their Names", Frühmittelalterliche Studien 15:495–511.
- 1982a. "Giants in Folklore and Mythology: A New Approach", Folklore 93:70–84.
- 1982b. "Freyja, Anat, Ishtar and Inanna: Some Cross-Cultural Comparisons", Mankind Quarterly 23:195–212.
- 1983. "The Wise One of the Mountain: Form, Function and Significance of the Subterranean Smith: A Study in Folklore", Göppingen: Kümmerle. ISBN 3-87452-598-8.
- 1984a. "Giants and Giantesses:A Study in Norse Mythology and Belief", Amsterdamer Beiträge zur älteran Germanistik 22:83–108.
- 1984b. "Gods and Demons of the Wilderness: A Study in Norse Tradition", Arkiv för nordisk filologi 99:175–187.
- 1984c. "The Winter Goddess: Percht, Holda and Related Figures", Folklore 95:151–166.
- 1984d. "Trolls and the Æsir: Lexical Evidence concerning North Germanic Faith", Indogermanische Forschungen 89:179–195.
- 1986. "New Thoughts on Volundarkviða", Saga-Book 22:50–68.
- 1987a. "Old Icelandic Giants and their Names", Frühmittelalterliche Studien 21:295–317.
- 1987b. "The Families of Giants", Arkiv för nordisk filologi 102:216–236.
- 1988. "The Storm of Troll-Women", Maal og Minne 31–41.
- 1991a. "The Cosmic Ash and other Trees of Germanic Myth", Arv 47:127–141.
- 1991b. "The Poets and the Goddess," in Preprints of the Eighth International Saga Conference: The Audience of the Sagas (Lars Lönnroth, ed.), 2:127–33.
- 1992. "The Goddess Nerthus: A New Approach", Amsterdamer Beiträge zur älteren Germanistik 36:1–19.
- 1993a, The Beauty and the Hag: Female Figures of Germanic Faith and Myth. Wien: Fassbaender. ISBN 3-900538-40-9.
- 1993b. "Gullveig's Ordeal: A New Interpretation." Arkiv för nordisk filologi 108:80–92.
- 1993c. "þorr's River Crossing", Saga-Book 23:469–487.
- 1993d. "The Host of Dvalinn: Thoughts on Some Dwarf-Names in Old Icelandic." Collegium Medievale 6:81–96.
- 1994. "The Magician and His Craft." Collegium Medievale 7:5–31.
- 1996a. The King, the Champion and the Sorcerer: A Study in Germanic Myth. Wien: Fassbaender. ISBN 3-900538-57-3.
- 1996b. "Kingship and the Giants", Arkiv för nordisk filologi 111:73–88.
- 1996c. "The Power of Speech: Eddic Poems and their Frames", Amsterdamer Beiträge zur älteren Germanistik 46:105–117.
- 1997a. The Faces of the Goddess. New York & Oxford: Oxford University Press. ISBN 0-19-508967-7.
- 1997b. "The Germanic Thunderweapon", Saga-Book 24:329–350.
- 1998a. "The Sky God of the Indo-Europeans", Indogermanische Forschungen 103:28–39.
- 1998b. "The Great Goddess of the North", Arkiv för nordisk filologi 113:29–57.
- 1998c. "Oðinnn's Vision", Maal og Minne 11–19.

== See also ==
- Hilda Ellis Davidson
- Jan de Vries (philologist)
- Marija Gimbutas
- Elena Efimovna Kuzmina
- John Lindow
- Emily Lyle
- Anna Melyukova
- Bertha Phillpotts
- Rudolf Simek
- Jacqueline Simpson
