= Robert Cryan =

Irish doctor (1827–1881)

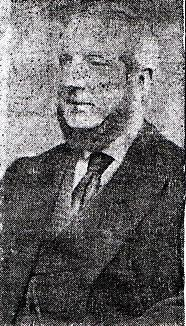
- Born: 1827; Ireland
- Died: 17 February 1881 (aged 53–54); Dublin, Ireland
- Occupations: Physician; professor
- Known for: Practicing physician and professor of anatomy and physiology at the Catholic University, Dublin, Ireland

Robert William Whitty Cryan (1827–1881) was an Irish medical doctor, professor of Anatomy and Physiology at the Catholic University in Dublin, Ireland, as well as a lecturer on anatomy and Physiology at the Carmichael School of Medicine in Dublin.

== Medical career ==
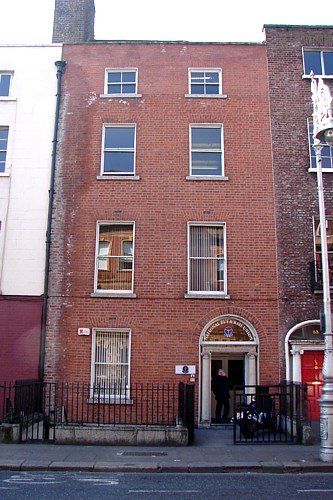
Dr Cryan's house at 54 Parnell Square, Dublin Ireland, photographed March 2009

Robert Cryan lived at 54 Rutland Square, (now called Parnell Square), Dublin, Ireland, and was licensed to practice medicine in 1847 by the Royal College of Surgeons. In 1849 he joined the King and Queen's College of Physicians as Licentiate in Medicine. Some time later Cryan was Elected Physician at St Vincent's Hospital on St Stephen's Green in Dublin where he engaged in clinical practice and teaching. Cryan lectured on anatomy and physiology in the Carmichael School of Medicine. Shortly after the founding of the Medical School of the Catholic University in Ireland, Cryan was appointed Professor of Anatomy and Physiology where he taught until his death in 1881. In 1873 Cryan was elected a Fellow of the King and Queen's College of Physicians and he was a member of the Royal Irish Academy in Dublin.

== Personal ==
Cryan was the son of Robert Cryan and Mary Anne Cryan of Boyle, County Roscommon, Ireland. He had two sisters, Mary Anne and Belinda, two half brothers, Peter, (also a doctor), John, and a half sister, Bridget. He was married to Mary Whitty, daughter of Nicholas and Mary Whitty, and had one son, a writer, Robert William Whitty Cryan. Cryan died at age 54 at his home in Dublin on 17 February 1881 and left a "considerable fortune" to his family. Cryan is buried at Glasnevin Cemetery in Dublin.

== Arms ==
Coat of arms of Robert Cryan
| Notes Granted 3 July 1922 by Sir Nevile Rodwell Wilkinson, Ulster King of Arms. Crest On a wreath of the colours a demi-lion rampant Sable guttee d'eau supporting between the paws an antique harp Gules Escutcheon Quarterly 1st & 4th Sable guttee d'eau a lion rampant Or armed and langued Gules on a canton Argent an antique harp GUules (Cryan) 2nd & 3rd Argent a lion rampant Gules on a chief of the second three mullets of the first (Whitty). Motto Nihil Sine Lachrymis |
