= Anne Dhu McLucas =

American musicologist, ethnomusicologist and administrator

- Born: July 26, 1941; Denver, Colorado, US
- Died: September 8, 2012 (aged 71); Eugene, Oregon, US

Academic background
- Education: University of Colorado; Harvard University

Academic work
- Discipline: ethnomusicology
- Institutions: Boston College; Colorado College; Harvard University; Wellesley College; University of Oregon
- Main interests: American and Scottish traditional music

Anne Dhu McLucas (July 26, 1941 – September 8, 2012) was an American ethnomusicologist and educator known for her research on American and Scottish traditional music. McLucas (née Shapiro) attended the University of Colorado and Harvard University, receiving her doctorate from Harvard in 1975. She taught at Boston College, Colorado College, Harvard University, Wellesley College, and the University of Oregon. She was the dean of the University of Oregon School of Music and Dance from 1992 to 2002, where she continued to teach as an emerita faculty member until her death.

McLucas was murdered, along with her partner, James Gillette, in their home on September 8, 2012 in Eugene, Oregon. They were both murdered by Johan Gillette, James Gillette's son.

The Society for American Music (where she had served as president from 1997 through 1999) established a fellowship in her honor.
