= Tom Munnelly =

Irish folk-song collector (1944–2007)

Tom Munnelly (25 May 1944 – 30 August 2007) was an Irish folk-song collector.

== Early years ==
Tom Munnelly was born in Rathmines in Dublin, and went to Clogher Road Technical College. He took up factory work at the age of 15. At a scout camp he became interested in folk songs. To enlarge his own repertoire he acquired a tape recorder. In 1965 Munnelly met an Irish Traveller John Reilly and recorded "The Maid and the Palmer". He called it "The Well Below The Valley". It was the first time this song had been collected from oral tradition in 150 years. Christy Moore in the magazine "Swing 51" (1989) recalled that "British folklorists ... wouldn't accept that it was genuine. They reckoned it was a put-up and they couldn't accept that this song had appeared in the West of Ireland because it had never appeared there before." In 1972, Munnelly played the tape to Christy Moore who subsequently performed it on Planxty's album "The Well Below The Valley". Planxty also sang "The Raggle Taggle Gypsy". Again the source was Munnelly's recordings of Reilly. Later Sinéad O'Connor was inspired by Munnelly's recording of "Lord Baker". Her own version is based on the singing of Reilly.

== Academic appointments ==
A. L. Lloyd introduced him to D. K. Wilgus, professor of Anglo-American folk song. In 1969, Munnelly became Wilgus's assistant. In 1970, he founded the Cumann Cheoil Tíre Éireann (the Folk Music Society of Ireland) together with Breandán Breathnach. In 1971, he joined Breathnach at the Department of Irish folklore at University College Dublin. In 1976, he was asked to recruit performers for the United States Bicentennial. His collection started appearing in commercially available form: "Paddy's Panacea" (Topic, 1978) and "Mount Callan Garland" (1994, but recorded 1984).

He recorded over 1,500 tapes (over 20,000 songs) of folksong and folklore. According to "Irish Philadelphia.com", it was the "largest ... collection of traditional song ever compiled by any one person". He then proceeded to transcribe and catalogue every note.

== County Clare ==
In 1978, he relocated from Dublin to County Clare with his wife Annette, their daughter Aideen and two sons, Colm and Tara. He was chairman of the Irish Traditional Music Archive in Dublin from 1987 to 1993. On 19 June 2007, he received an honorary doctorate from the National University of Ireland, Galway for services to Irish traditional music. He died in Miltown Malbay, County Clare.

== Writings ==
He wrote occasional articles for the "Folk Music Journal", the International Ballad Commission and the on-line magazine "Musical Traditions". Early in 2007, Anne Clune edited a collection of his essays, and tributes to him, "Dear Far-voiced Veteran (Essays in Honour of Tom Munnelly)", with contributions from Mícheál Ó Súilleabháin and Fintan Vallely.

== Discography ==
- "The Bonny Green Tree - Songs of an Irish Traveller" (John "Jacko" Reilly) 1978
- "Paddy's Panacea: Songs Traditional In West Clare" (Topic, 1978)
- "Songs of the Irish Travellers" (various artists) (1983)
- "The Mount Callan Garland: Songs from the repertoire of Tom Lenihan of Knockbrack, Miltown Malbay, County Clare" (1994) - book plus cassette

== Awards ==
Munnelly was the first person inducted into the hall of fame at the inaugural RTE folk awards in 2018. His wife Annette collected the award on his behalf and bequeathed the award to John Reilly and the travelling community.

== Bibliography ==
- "Breandan Breathnach" (2002) by Tom Munnelly and Nicholas Carolan
