= D. K. Wilgus =

Donald Knight Wilgus (December 1, 1918 – December 25, 1989) was an American folk song scholar and academic, most recognized for chronicling 'Hillbilly', blues music and Irish-American song and his contribution to ballad scholarship.

== Early life and education ==
Wilgus was born on December 1, 1918, at West Mansfield, Logan County, Ohio, and attended East High School (Columbus, Ohio) and obtained his B.A., M.A. and Ph.D. degrees at Ohio State University.

Wilgus's M.A. thesis has been cited as "the first academic study of commercially recorded country music". His doctoral dissertation, given in 1954 was awarded the 1956 Chicago Folklore Prize. It formed the basis for his Anglo-American Folksong Scholarship since 1898 (1959), which was described in the 1990s as "still the definitive work on the subject".

== Career ==
Wilgus worked as an administrator at Purdue University (1941–1942) and served in the U.S. Army 1942–1945. From 1950 to 1963 he taught at Western Kentucky State College, as associate professor and, from 1961, full professor. In 1955, Wilgus founded the Kentucky Folklore Record, which he edited until 1961.

Wilgus moved to University of California, Los Angeles (UCLA) in 1963. At UCLA he was professor of music and English at from 1963 until his death in 1989. At the university, together with his colleague Wayland D. Hand, Wilgus established the discipline of folklore studies. Wilgus was the first chair of the Folklore & Mythology Program at UCLA, a post he held from its founding in 1965 until 1982.

Wilgus also organized and directed five folk festivals on the UCLA campus, suggestive of his interest in the performance as well as of the study of folklore.

During his career, Wilgus carried out fieldwork around the Cumberland River, in Kentucky and Tennessee (with Lynwood Montell and around Ireland, recording the singers Tom Munnelly and John Reilly. His work around the Cumberland River made the case for the blues ballad to be seen as a subgenre of American balladry.

== Recognition ==
In 1957, Wilgus was awarded a Guggenheim Fellowship in the field of Folklore and Popular Culture.

Between 1971 and 1972, Wilgus served as president of the American Folklore Society (AFS). His presidential lecture was titled "The Text is the Thing" and has been described as "a lively response to the [then] current fashion in the field for performance studies."

Wilgus served as vice-president of the AFS, secretary-treasurer of the Kentucky Folklore Society and president of the California Folklore Society. He also edited the journal of the California Folklore Society, Western Folklore, from 1970 to 1975.

== Death ==
Wilgus died on December 25, 1989, in Los Angeles.

== Archive ==
The Ethnomusicology Archive at UCLA includes the D.K. Wilgus Collection, his collection of 3,000 field recordings and 8,000 commercial recordings of folk music. It was donated by Wilgus's widow, Eleanor R. Long-Wilgus, an eminent ballad scholar in her own right and who had collaborated with Wilgus on research into blues and Irish ballads.

== Selected publications ==
- Wilgus, D. K. (1959). Anglo-American folksong scholarship since 1898. New Brunswick, NJ: Rutgers University Press. ISBN 978-0-8135-0310-3. OCLC 188832.
- Wilgus, D. K. (1964). "Folksong and Folksong Scholarship: Changing Approaches and Attitudes. IV: The Rationalistic Approach". In Boatright, Mody C.; Hudson, Wilson M.; Maxwell, Allen (eds.). A Good Tale and a Bonnie Tune. Publications of the Texas Folklore Society. Dallas: Southern Methodist University Press. p. 227-237, 268. ISBN 978-0-585-27596-3. OCLC 1290922858.
- Wilgus, D. K. (1965). "An Introduction to the Study of Hillbilly Music". Journal of American Folklore. 78 (309): 195–203. doi:10.2307/538355. ISSN 0021-8715.
- Wilgus, D. K. (1970). "A Type-Index of Anglo-American Traditional Narrative Songs". Journal of the Folklore Institute. 7 (2/3): 161–170. doi:10.2307/3813870. ISSN 0015-5934.
- Wilgus, D. K. (1971). "Country-Western Music and the Urban Hillbilly". In Paredes, Americo; Stekert, Ellen J. (eds.). The Urban Experience and Folk Tradition. American Folklore Society Bibliographical and Special Series. Austin: University of Texas Press. p. 137–159. ISBN 978-0-292-70122-9. OCLC 832450870.
- Wilgus, D. K. (1973). "The Text Is the Thing". Journal of American Folklore. 86 (341): 241–252. doi:10.2307/539153. ISSN 0021-8715.
- Wilgus, D. K.; Long, Eleanor R. (1985). "The Blues Ballad and the Genesis of Style in Traditional Narrative Song". In Edwards, Carol L.; Manley, Kathleen E. B. (eds.). Narrative Folksong: New Directions: Essays in Appreciation of W. Edson Richmond. Boulder: Westview. pp. 435–482. OCLC 605968792.
- Wilgus, D. K. (1986). "The Comparative Approach". In Wilgus, D. K.; Toelken, Barre (eds.). The Ballad and the Scholars: Approaches to Ballad Study: Papers Presented at a Clark Library Seminar, 22 October 1983. Los Angeles: William Andrews Clark Memorial Library, University of California. pp. 3–28. OCLC 891416827.

=== As editor ===
- Combs, Josiah Henry (1967). Wilgus, D. K. (ed.). Folk-songs of the southern United States (Folk-songs du Midi des Etats-Unis). Austin: University of Texas Press. ISBN 9780292772694. OCLC 954021.
