= Gorteen =

Village in County Sligo, Ireland

Gurteen Irish: Goirtín
- Village
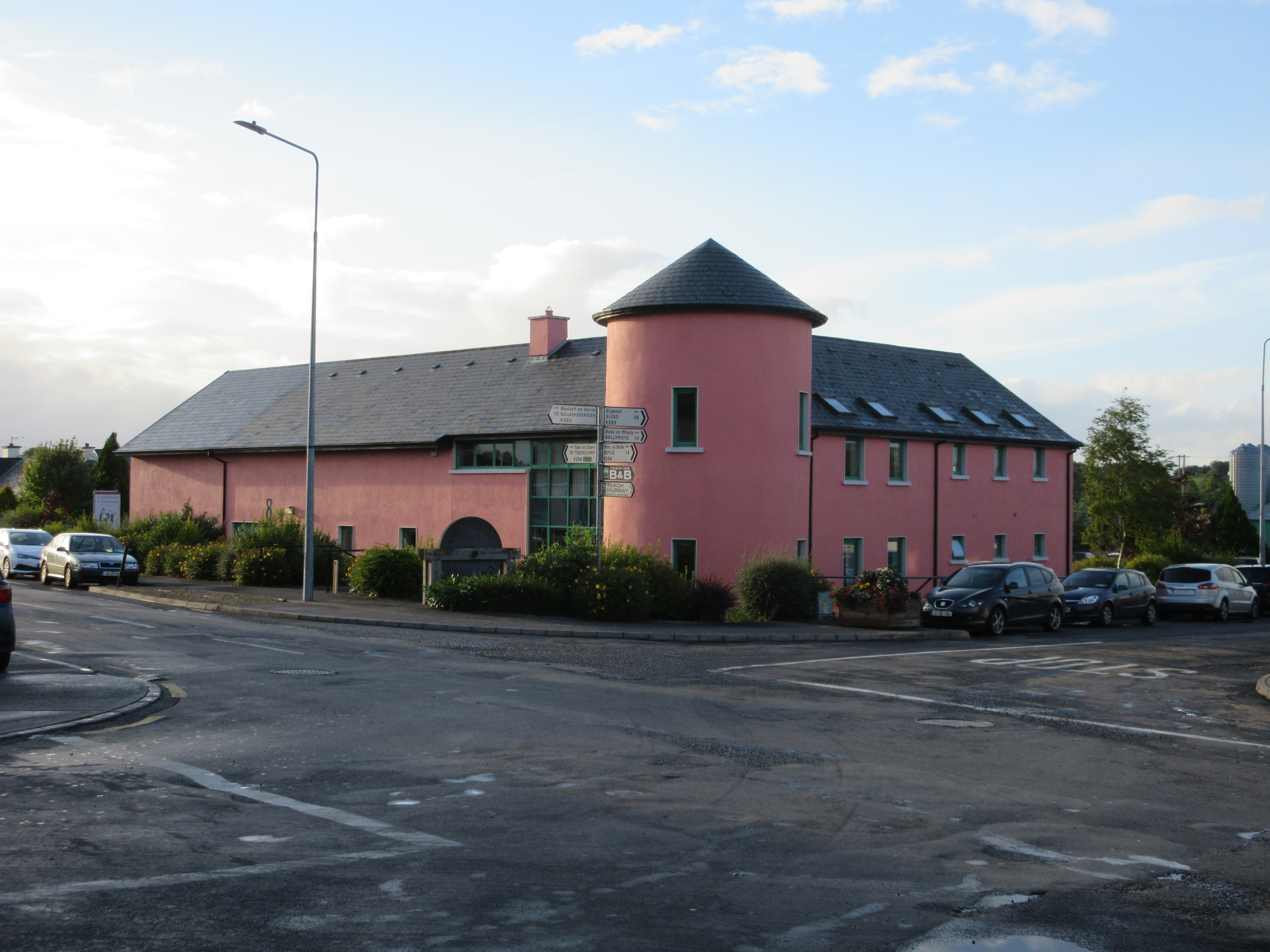
- Gurteen Cross and Coleman Music Centre

- Location in Ireland
- Coordinates: 53°59′34″N 8°30′39″W
- Country: Ireland
- Province: Connacht
- County: County Sligo
- Elevation: 82 m (269 ft)

Population (2022)
  - Total: 421
- Time zone: UTC+0 (WET)
  - Summer (DST): UTC-1 (IST (WEST))
- Irish Grid Reference: G665049

Gurteen or Gorteen (Irish: Goirtín, meaning 'little field') is a village in County Sligo, Ireland. It is in the civil parish of Kilfree in the baronry of Coolavin.

Gurteen's population increased from 269 people, at the 2006 census, to 421 at the 2022 census. It is at the intersection of the R293 road (Ballymote to Ballaghaderreen) and the R294 (Boyle to Tobercurry).

== Places of interest ==
The Michael Coleman Irish Music Centre, named for the musician Michael Coleman, is located in Gorteen. The Coleman Cottage, a traditional cottage, forge and archive, is located at Mount Irwin outside Gorteen.

== Transport ==
Bus Éireann routes 460 and 476 provide limited services through Gorteen on selected days of the week, while the TFI Local Link 977 route passes through Gorteen (8 times a day each way Monday to Saturday, 3 times each way on Sunday) between Castlerea and Sligo, via Ballaghaderreen.

Gurteen was previously served by Kilfree Junction railway station between Boyle and Ballymote on the Dublin to Sligo line. This station opened in October 1874 and closed in February 1963.

== See also ==
- List of towns in the Republic of Ireland
- Ballaghaderreen railway station
