= Monasteraden =

Monasteraden Mainistir Réadáin
- Village
- Location in Ireland
- Coordinates: 53°57′00″N 8°30′00″W
- Country: Ireland
- Province: Connacht
- County: County Sligo
- Time zone: UTC+0 (WET)
  - Summer (DST): UTC-1 (IST (WEST))
- Irish Grid Reference: G672001

Monasteraden (Irish: Mainistir Réadáin, meaning 'Redan's monastery') is a village in County Sligo, Ireland. The village is located on the shores of Lough Gara. St. Aiden's church is the village's church.

== Geography ==
Monasteraden lies to the west of Lough Gara and with the Curlew Mountains inlier of sandstones and conglomerates to the north. To the west lies the townland of Clogher with Edmondstown and Ballaghaderreen in neighbouring County Roscommon. Monasteraden is in the barony of Coolavin in south County Sligo.

== Culture and community ==
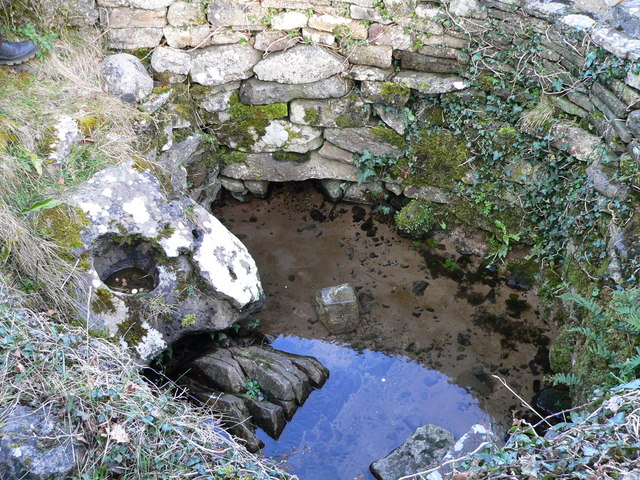
St Attracta's Well

The holy well named for St Attracta was formerly a local source of drinking water. Lough Gara is fished for brown trout and is divided by the bridge at Clooncunny.

== Transport ==
Island Road railway station served Monasteraden and formerly had frequent trains passing by on the Ballaghaderreen branch line with connections to Dublin. The station was closed in 1963 and the station building is now a private home. The nearest railway station is now Boyle, 10 miles (16 km) away.

== Education ==
The local national school is St. Aiden's. The school has produced a 32-minute movie entitled "The Train" bringing together rare footage and interviews with local people associated with the Ballaghaderreen branch line.

== See also ==
- List of towns and villages in Ireland
