= Edward Forbes Walker =

British Isles international rugby union player

E. F. Walker
- Born: Edward Forbes Walker; 1876 West Norwood, London
- Died: unknown
- School: Eastbourne College

Rugby union career
- Position: Wing
Senior career
Years	Team	Apps	(Points)
- Lennox FC
- Middlesex
International career
Years	Team	Apps	(Points)
1903	British Isles	2	(Pts:0)

Edward Forbes Walker (born 1876) was a rugby union international who represented Great Britain on the 1903 tour to South Africa. He represented Great Britain twice but never won a cap for his national side, England.

== Early life and family ==
Edward Forbes Walker was the youngest of the nine children of William Walker and his wife Anna. William Walker was a Colonial Engineer, a position of some prestige in the Victorian era in the United Kingdom, and hailed from Houghton le Spring, County Durham. Although William had relatively humble origins, a long and successful career meant that Edward was born into an affluent family. William had served a seven-year apprenticeship at the engine works of the Thornley Colliery and afterwards worked at the locomotive works of the North Eastern Railway, Bank Top, Darlington. He then went on to the works of Messrs. Fossick & Hackworth, Stockton-on-Tees and in 1853 moved again, this time to the works of Messrs. Thomas Richardson Sons, Hartlepool. At this company he spent two of his three years as one of their leading hands, and went to sea as engineer in charge of the first three steamers built by the company. In 1856 while with the third steamer he accepted an engagement with the Borneo Company and then was appointed superintendent engineer to the Netherlands India (Java) Mail Company, with whom he remained ten years until the expiration of their mail contract in 1869 continuing afterwards with their successors for a while. In this time, he had married Anna, from Dundee in 1862. The eldest child within the family was an adopted daughter, Eliza Smith (born in 1859 in Java). During William's time in Java his family expanded. Ralph (born 1865), John H. (born 1867), Annie (also Nancy) born 1871, Catherine (born 1872) and William (born 1873) were all born there. The family returned to the United Kingdom, and Lissie M. was born in Bow, London in 1874 and the Edward was born in 1876 in Norwood. At this point, they were living in the well to do suburb of Dulwich on one of the most affluent roads, Alleyn Park Road. The house they lived in was named Kaliemas, after the Kali Mas River, that runs through modern day Surabaya, Java and it was here that Edward spent his childhood. Edward, despite living opposite Dulwich College was sent to Eastbourne to boarding school at Eastbourne College.

Edward's older brother was John H. Walker. Edward was referred to in a report on the 1903 tour to South Africa as the brother of "Johnny" Walker of Durban fame, which is likely a reference to John H. Walker who was caught up in the Boer War in South Africa. He was not a combatant, but gained notoriety due to his escape from the Boers after being captured. He had been surveying in Mapoch's country with the chief, under a strong guard and the chief's protection. However, he was eventually captured and taken to Middelburg. He and a fellow prisoner escaped with their horses, a dog, and a tin of biscuits on which they lived for a week, eventually making their way to the Swazi king, where they were treated well. They then walked to Delagoa Bay and caught the Union steamship SS Natal to Durban.

== Career ==
In 1901, aged 25, he was living by his means and still in his mother's house. However, his father had died in 1894 and the family had left Alleyn Park Road in Dulwich and moved to the nearby Norwood. It is unclear if Edward did take up a profession, because in 1911 although he had moved to Clifton Gardens in Maida Vale, this was still the family home and he lived there with his mother and two of his sisters (as well as with a cook, parlormaid and housemaid) and stated that he was living by his own means.

== Rugby career ==
Walker played for a side local to where he had grown up in Dulwich, called Lennox Football Club. The team were based in Dulwich when he started playing for them, though during his time with them they did move elsewhere. With this side he gained an excellent reputation in the South of England as a three-quarter. He was selected for the 1903 tour to South Africa and was described as a consistent player and played in two of the tests. On his return to the United Kingdom he continued to play for Lennox and in 1906 was the captain of the side. The side at that point was not so strong as in previous seasons though it was said that in Blackwood who played alongside Walker they had a player that would have been selected England had he not been injured. He was also later involved in the game as a referee and in 1909 was a joint honorary secretary of the London Rugby Society of Referees.
