= Ballaghaderreen branch line =

Historical railway line in Ireland

Overview
- Other name(s): The Kilfree line
- Status: Ceased operation
- Owner: Sligo & Ballahaderreen Railway Company; Midland Great Western Railway; Great Southern Railways; Córas Iompair Éireann
- Locale: County Sligo and County Roscommon, Ireland; 53.938500°N 8.489056°W (Island road station line midpoint)
- Termini: Kilfree Junction; Ballaghaderreen
- Stations: 4

Service
- Type: Heavy rail
- System: Córas Iompair Éireann
- Operator(s): Midland Great Western Railway; Great Southern Railways; Córas Iompair Éireann

History
- Opened: 1874
- Closed: 1963

Technical
- Line length: 9.75 miles (15.69 km)
- Track length: 9.75 miles (15.69 km)
- Number of tracks: Single track
- Character: Secondary
- Track gauge: 1,600 mm (5 ft 3 in) Irish gauge
- Electrification: Not electrified

The Ballaghaderreen branch line connected Ballaghaderreen railway station to Kilfree Junction on the Dublin to Sligo main line. It opened in 1874 and closed in 1963.

== History ==
Sligo and Ballaghaderreen Junction Railway Act 1863
- Act of Parliament
- Parliament of the United Kingdom
- Long title: An Act to authorize the Construction of a Railway from the Midland Great Western Railway of Ireland to the Town of Ballaghaderreen; and for other Purposes.
- Citation: 26 & 27 Vict. c. clx

Dates
- Royal assent: 13 July 1863

Text of statute as originally enacted

Sligo and Ballaghaderreen Junction Railway Act 1866
- Act of Parliament
- Parliament of the United Kingdom
- Long title: An Act to renew and extend the Powers of the Sligo and Ballaghaderreen Junction Railway Company; and for other Purposes.
- Citation: 29 & 30 Vict. c. ccclx

Dates
- Royal assent: 10 August 1866

Sligo and Ballaghaderreen Junction Railway Act 1871
- Act of Parliament
- Parliament of the United Kingdom
- Long title: An Act to extend the powers of the Sligo and Ballaghaderreen Junction Railway Company for the taking of Lands and the Completion of their Undertaking; and for other purposes.
- Citation: 34 & 35 Vict. c. clxxiv

Dates
- Royal assent: 31 July 1871

Text of statute as originally enacted

The Sligo and Ballaghaderreen Junction Railway (S&BJR) was incorporated by the Sligo and Ballaghaderreen Junction Railway Act 1863 (26 & 27 Vict. c. clx) with the purpose of connecting the village of Ballaghaderreen to the newly opened extension of the Midland Great Western Railway (MGWR) from Longford to Sligo.

The line opened in 1874 and was operated by the MGWR. Although costing £80,000 to build, it was sold to the MGWR for £24,000 under the Midland Great Western Railway of Ireland Act 1877 (40 & 41 Vict. c. cxxxix), after spending time under the administration of creditors due to non-payment of debts Of this, £13,300 went to the Board of Works to repay its loan and the balance to the Consett Iron Company – leaving the original shareholders with nothing.

In 1924, the MGWR was part of a merger forming the Great Southern Railway company which became the Great Southern Railways in 1925.

In the adjournment debate Portlaoighise-Mountmellick Railway in 1944 indicated the Ballaghaderreen branch line had closed but was re-opened on the behest of a member of the house.

The line finally closed on Saturday 2 February 1963. The last return trip from Ballaghaderreen at 11:50 was hauled by 0-6-0 steam locomotive 574, and on the return from Kilfree Junction a local band played a farewell. The last train was a special cattle train hauled by B133 leaving Ballaghaderreen at 15:22.

== Route ==
The route begins at Kilfree Junction at milepost 112½ (181.1 km) on the Dublin-Sligo line. Branch line trains have their own platform. Freight and special trains from Sligo can enter the branch without reversing. The branch curves off from the main line on an embankment and goes down steeply to milepost 2(3.2 km). Excellent views of Lough Gara are visible to the south east until reaching Island Road station serving Monasteradin at 5 miles (8.0 km). This stationed was only opened in 1909. Edmondstown station is reached at milepost 6¾ (10.9 km) and thereafter line crosses wild boggy country until at 9.75 miles (15.69 km) the end of the line is reached at Ballaghaderreen.

== Services ==
The basic passenger service level was three or four round trips per day apart from a period of one round trip per day during the "Emergency". Between 1947 and closure service decreased to two round trips in the morning and early afternoon. They were designed to connect with services on the main line at Kilfree Junction. Most services were mixed passenger and freight. There was some limited working of diesel locomotives on special and freight trains with the single ended 121 class being noted; these would be turned on the turntables as required. The 2600 class AEC-engineed railcars were also used on some Sunday specials.

== Rolling stock ==
Regular scheduled passenger services on the branch line were always steam operated until the end. The William Fairbairn & Sons built MGWR Class 8 No. 35 Wren was allocated to working the branch from the outset until withdrawal in 1885. Thereafter J26 0-6-0T (GSR 551 Class) seemed to be used up to the 1940s. G2 2-4-0 (GSR 650 Class) took over in the 1950s with 666 and 667 typically used in rotation. From about 1955 until closure the J18 0-6-0 (GSR 573 Class) became the designated locomotive. In later years special trains and freight were sometimes operated by diesel.

== Incidents ==
During the Irish War of Independence trains were regularly stopped on the branch line with British soldiers and Royal Irish Constabulary (RIC) disarmed and goods for Belfast confiscated. In one particularly serious incident in May 1921 a train was hi-jacked and used to shoot at the RIC Barracks in Ballaghaderreen.

== Kilfree line community greenway proposal ==
The Ballaghaderreen Chamber of Commerce have proposed converting the old line into a greenway.

== Media ==
St. Aiden's National School in Monasteraden produced a 32-minute movie entitled "The Train" bringing together rare footage and interviews with local people.
