= Máire McDonnell-Garvey =

Irish traditional musician and writer

- fair use image
- Born: Máire McDonnell; 10 July 1927; Tobracken, County Roscommon, Ireland
- Died: 29 August 2009 (aged 82); Dublin, Ireland
- Education: B.A., HDip.
- Alma mater: University College Dublin
- Known for: Traditional Irish music

Máire McDonnell-Garvey (10 July 1927 – 29 August 2009) was a traditional Irish musician and writer.

== Biography ==
Máire McDonnell was born on 10 July 1927 in Tobracken, County Roscommon to James McDonnell and Annie Theresa Talbot. McDonnell-Garvey was one of three children. Her mother died while she was doing her Leaving Certificate. McDonnell-Garvey went to school in the Sisters of Charity in Ballaghadereen. McDonnell-Garvey was taught the violin by PJ Giblin. McDonnell-Garvey married Bob Garvey in 1948 and they moved to Walkinstown, Dublin. The couple had five children. McDonnell-Garvey spent twenty five years teaching night classes for Conradh na Gaeilge. She was secretary of the Dublin County Board of Comhaltas Ceoltóirí Éireann and spent time at the St Mary's Music Club on Church Street, Dublin.

In the 1940s McDonnell-Garvey played with the Aiséirigh Céilí Band. In the 1960s she played with Eamonn Ceannt Céilí Band. McDonnell-Garvey, Dónal Ó hÉalaí and Ciaráin Ó Rathallaigh founded the traditional music group, Comhrá na dTonn. She also worked with them to collect and research Irish music which lead to her first book Mid-Connaught – The Ancient Territory of Sliabh Lugha about Mayo, Roscommon, Sligo and Galway. McDonnell-Garvey also wrote three other publications; A Traditional Music Journey 1600 – 2000, Cómhrá na dTonn, The conversation of the waves, and Under the Shadow of the Summerhills.

McDonnell-Garvey went back to college as a mature student and graduated from University College Dublin with a B.A in Irish, history and English in 1970. When she completed the degree she went on to finish a Higher Diploma in Education. McDonnell-Garvey then taught in Ardscoil Éanna and Collinstown Park Community College.

She performed on a number of albums The Windy Turn and Whispering Strains of the Past. McDonnell-Garvey made sure her teacher, PJ Giblin, music was reissued on The Giblin Legacy. McDonnell-Garvey was awarded a Gradam award for her lifetime contribution to traditional Irish music by the Douglas Hyde Summer School in 2007. She died in Dublin on 29 August 2009.
