= John O'Gorman =

John O'Gorman may refer to:

- John O'Gorman (piper) (1860s–?), Irish piper
- John O'Gorman (rugby union) (1936–2024), Australian rugby union player
- John Joseph O'Gorman (1866–1935), Irish bishop
