= Lough Gara =

Lake in Ireland (counties Sligo, Roscommon)

- Loch Uí Ghadhra (Irish)
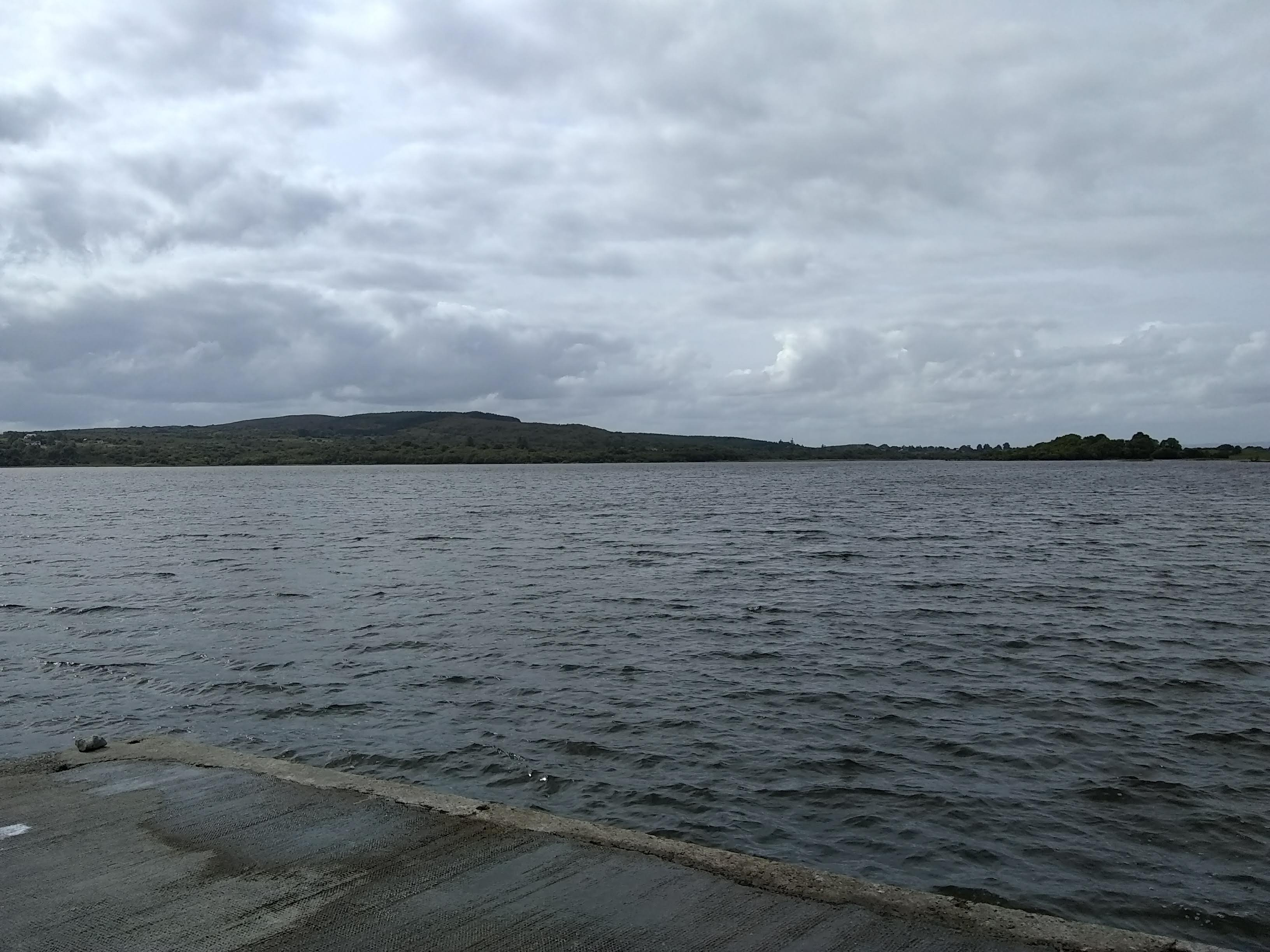

- Location in Ireland
- Location: County Sligo, County Roscommon
- Coordinates: 53°57′N 8°27′W
- Catchment area: 499.69 km^{2} (192.93 sq mi)
- Basin countries: Ireland
- Max. length: 4 mi (6.4 km)
- Max. width: 2.5 mi (4.0 km)
- Surface area: 12.57 km^{2} (4.85 sq mi)
- Surface elevation: 66 m (217 ft)
- Settlements: Monasteraden

Ramsar Wetland
- Designated: 7 June 1996
- Reference no.: 852

Lough Gara (Irish: Loch Uí Ghadhra) is a lake in counties Sligo and Roscommon, Ireland. It is an Important Bird Area protecting 1,788 ha of which most (1,742 ha) is designated as a Ramsar Site (a wetland having international importance under the Ramsar Convention).

== History ==
Lough Gara was known in ancient times as Loch Techet, but the O’Garas, during their ownership of the Coolavin district from about the thirteenth century, renamed the lake "Loch Uí Ghadhra". The first documented reference appeared in 1285. Even though the family lost control of all their Coolavin townlands about 1650, their name has remained on the lake to the present day. The area around Lough Gara is referred to as "O'Gara heartland".

== Location and size ==
Lough Gara is situated mainly in south County Sligo with a smaller part of the lake in County Roscommon. From north to south the lake spans about four miles. The widest section is a two and a half mile span. The lake lies south west of the Curlew Mountains with the town of Ballaghaderreen situated almost four miles to the southwest and the town of Boyle positioned just over four miles from its north eastern corner.

Water is supplied to the lake by the Lung River, which enters at the southwestern angle, and the Breedoge River, which enters the lake at the southeastern angle. From the main upper lake the outflow is through the northeastern corner at Cuppanagh, the channel has one wide stretch about a mile long, which is called Lower Lough Gara. From that point the water flow is termed the Boyle River which flows past the town of Boyle into Lough Key and on to the Shannon. The lake has a number of islands. The main upper lake is divided into two sections with a strip of land and Clooncunny Bridge in between.

== Iron Age crannogs ==
Many of the islands on Lough Gara are man-made islands called crannógs. Excavations carried out in the 1950s yielded Iron Age, Bronze Age and early Christian period objects. Christina Fredengren, the archaeologist who recently worked on a few of the sites, points out that some of these crannógs were built over two thousand years ago.
