= Kilfree Junction railway station =

Former railway station in Ireland

Kilfree Junction

General information
- Location: Ireland
- Coordinates: 53.992°N 8.441°W
- Distance: 112.5 mils (2.86×10^{−6} km)
- Platforms: 3

History
- Opened: 1874
- Closed: 1963
- Original company: Sligo and Ballaghaderreen Railway
- Pre-grouping: Midland Great Western Railway
- Pre-nationalisation: Great Southern Railways

Services
	Former services	
Boyle	Dublin-Sligo	Ballymote
	Disused railways	
Terminus	Ballaghaderreen branch	Island Road
Location

Kilfree Junction is a former station in County Sligo and was located on the Sligo line in the townland of Cloontycarn between Boyle and Ballymote about 1 mile (1.6 km) from the track summit though the Curlew Mountains. It enabled connections on the branch line to Ballaghaderreen in County Roscommon. The junction faced Ballymote and Sligo station and was a trailing junction in the Boyle and Dublin Connolly direction requiring a reversal. The station was not located near any significant settlement, the nearest, Gorteen in County Sligo being over 6 km away.

The station had three platforms: two served a passing loop on the main line and the third was used by the branch line. All main line trains usually used the island platform for easier transfers to the branch line. The station had sidings and turntable for turning round engines coming up from the branch line together with a loop for running the branch line train. There was a signal box and a house for the station master.

== History ==
This railway station opened by the Sligo and Ballaghderreen Railway on 31 October 1874, becoming part of the Midland Great Western Railway (MGWR) in 1877.

The MGWR was joined with other railways companies to form Great Southern Railway company in 1924 and with a further merger in 1925 the station came under Great Southern Railways.

The station closed on 4 February 1963 with the closure of the branch line. The last passenger train back to Ballaghaderreen at 13:00 set off a large number of denotators set on the track to mark the departure.

The passing loop has since been removed leaving the main line as single track. Only part of the island platform and the station masters' house remain. The embankment of the branch line is still visible from trains passing on the main line.

== Etymology ==
Kilfree is the name of the civil parish covering both the location of Kilfree Junction and the area in County Sligo the branch line ran through. Kilfree is also the name of the townland where the parish church once stood, the townland location is near the R293 road some way from both Kilfree Junction and the route of the branch line.

== Incidents ==
Kilfree Junction was the scene of several incidents in the Irish War of Independence including carriages containing members of the British Army being shot at and Royal Irish Constabulary officers being overpowered and disarmed in January 1921.

On or about 8:00 am in June 1956 a freight train approaching downhill from Dublin North Wall to Sligo failed to halt at the signal box as directed and crashed through buffers at the end of a siding. The body of the year old diesel-electric locomotive A44 sheered off from the bogies, somersaulting three times over 25 yards and ending up 50 feet below on the mainline. The driver escaped with minor injuries and was discharged from hospital after one day. The 12 wagons were wrecked and contents spread over a large area. A cargo of gelignite was dealt with first, and cargo of carbide marked Dangerous when dry was handled next. The fate of remaining cargo including whiskey and stout does not appear to be recorded. Breakdown crews from Dublin, Galway and Athlone were rapidly on the scene with a breakdown crane and the wreckage quickly cleared. Locomotive A44 was subsequently repaired and returned to service.
