= MGWR Class 6 =

Class of 2 Irish 2-4-0 locomotives

MGWR Classes 6, 8, 10, 11, 17 and 18
Type and origin
- Power type: Steam
- Builder: Longridge; Fairbairn; Grendon; R. Stephenson; Fossick & Hackworth; Avonside
- Build date: 1846-1862
Specifications
- Configuration
  - Whyte: 2-4-0
- Gauge: 5 ft 3 in (1,600 mm)
Career
- Operators: Midland Great Western Railway (MGWR)
- Locale: Ireland

The Midland Great Western Railway (MGWR) Classes 6, 8, 10, 11, 17 and 18 were 2-4-0 locomotives introduced in the period 1852-1870. The 22 locomotives were spread across 6 different manufacturers and all were withdrawn in the decade between 1880 and 1890 though some donated parts to other builds at Broadstone Works.

== MGWR Class 6 ==
Ordered from R. B. Longridge and Company, the MGWR Class 6 were 2-4-0 locomotives were the first coupled locomotives on the MGWR. They ran high mileages for goods engines and were noted on passenger duties in Mayo in 1876. They were withdrawn in 1880.

MGWR No.	Name	Introduced	Withdrawn
25	Cyclops	1852	1880
26	Vulcan	1852	1880

== MGWR Class 8 ==
The four 2-4-0 engines ordered from William Fairbairn & Sons in 1852 were designated MGWR Class 8. They may have resembled similar locomotives order for the Waterford and Limerick Railway at this time, later designated GSWR Class 264. Locomotive No. 35 is noted for working the Ballaghaderreen branch line from 1874 (when the line opened) until the locomotive was withdrawn in 1885.

MGWR No.	Name	Introduced	Withdrawn
32	(unnamed)	1853	1880
33	(unnamed)	1853	1880
34	(unnamed)	1854	1880
35	Wren	1854	1885

== MGWR Class 10 ==
The MGWR Class 10 engines from Thomas Grendon and Company of Drogheda were introduced in the period 1856-1860.

MGWR No.	Name	Introduced	Withdrawn
1	Orion	1860	1882/4
2	Jupiter	1857	1880
3	Juno	1857	1880
4	Venus	1857	1882/4
5	Mars	1857	1882/4
6	Vesta	1857	1880/4
41	Emperor	1856	1880
42	Regal	1856	1880/3

== MGWR Class 11 ==
MGWR Class 11 consisted of a single engine from R. Stephenson. The almost-immediate delivery from time of order indicated it was likely the engine had already been constructed.

MGWR No.	Name	Introduced	Withdrawn
42	Ouzel	1856	1880

== MGWR Class 17 ==
This Fossick & Hackworth locomotive was originally supplied to the Dublin & Meath Railway where it was known as drag-all. In 1864, the Dublin & Meath Railway were undergoing some financial difficulties which may account for the locomotives transfer. It was later renumbered from 11 to 85 to be outside the range used for the later MGWR Class 18. It was reputed to be less successful on the MGWR.

MGWR No.	Name	Introduced	Withdrawn
11→85	Meath	1864 (1862 D&M)	1885

== MGWR Class 18 ==
The final 2-4-0 engines ordered in the pre Martin Atock era were from Avonside and formed MGWR Class 18. They were the only significant non 4-2-0 order made by the locomotive engineer Robert Rampage. They were replaced in 1889 by six Broadstone build 2-4-0 locomotives of MGWR Class 7–12 carrying the same numbers and names.

MGWR No.	Name	Introduced	Withdrawn
7	Connemara	1869	1889
8	St. Patrick	1870	1890
9	Emerald Isle	1869	1890
10	Faugh a Ballagh	1869	1890
11	Erin go Bragh	1869	1889
12	Shamrock	1870	1890
