= Prince of Coolavin =

Irish Clan

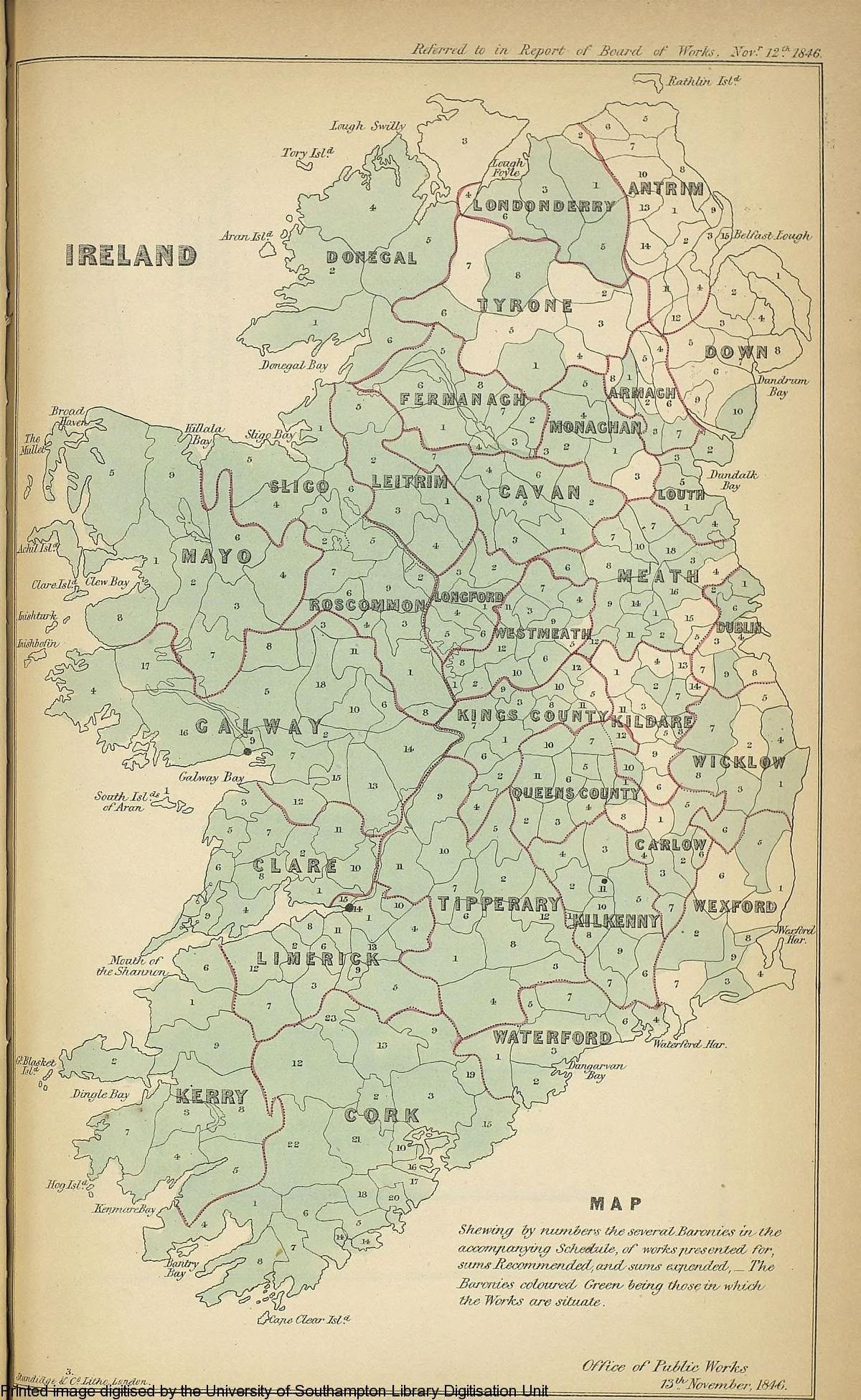
Baronies of Ireland 1846 - Coolavin is Barony #2 in County Sligo

Prince of Coolavin was a title first applied by popular usage to Charles MacDermot, 1707–1758, then head of the MacDermot family of Moylurg. Coolavin (Cúl ó bhFionn) is a barony in south County Sligo in Ireland. Up to the late 16th century the head of the family were still Kings of Moylurg, but had lost their lands due to confiscation.

The adoption of the term indicated that the family considered themselves "princes", and also considered as such by their neighbours. The title continued to be used by the head of the family into the 21st century.

== Title holders ==
- Charles MacDermot, The MacDermot (1707–1758), first to be styled Prince of Coolavin.
- Myles MacDermot, The MacDermot, (1758-1792).
- Hugh MacDermot, The MacDermot, (1792-1824).
- Charles Joseph MacDermot, The MacDermot J.P., (1824-1873).
- Hugh Hyacinth O'Rorke MacDermot, The MacDermot, (1873-1904).
- Charles Edward MacDermot, The MacDermot, (1904-1947).
- Charles John MacDermot, The MacDermot (1947-1979).
- Sir Dermot MacDermot, The MacDermot, (1979-1989).
- Niall Anthony MacDermot, The MacDermot (1989-2003).
- Rory MacDermot, The MacDermot (2003-2021).

== In popular culture ==
The Princess Royal or Miss 'MacDermot was a tune by the Irish harpist Turlough O'Carolan (1670 – 25 March 1738). The tune was adopted for the sea shanty The Saucy Arethusa which was performed at the Theatre Royal in London in 1796. While some attribute The Saucy Aruthesa to the composer William Shield, others have attributed the adaptation to the playwright Prince Hoare.

A film, titled Heroes and Princes, was produced by the children of St. Aiden's National School, Monasteraden and celebrates the MacDermots of Collavin. It includes a composition titled The Prince's March.

== See also ==
- Chiefs of the Name
