= Paul Weston (disambiguation) =

Paul Weston (1912–1996) was an American pianist, arranger, composer and conductor; husband of singer Jo Stafford.

Paul Weston may also refer to:

- Paul Weston (footballer) (born 1957), Australian rules footballer
- Paul Weston (politician) (born 1964), British politician
- Paul Weston (In Treatment), a character from the American television series In Treatment
