= Gabriel Byrne =

Irish actor (born 1950)

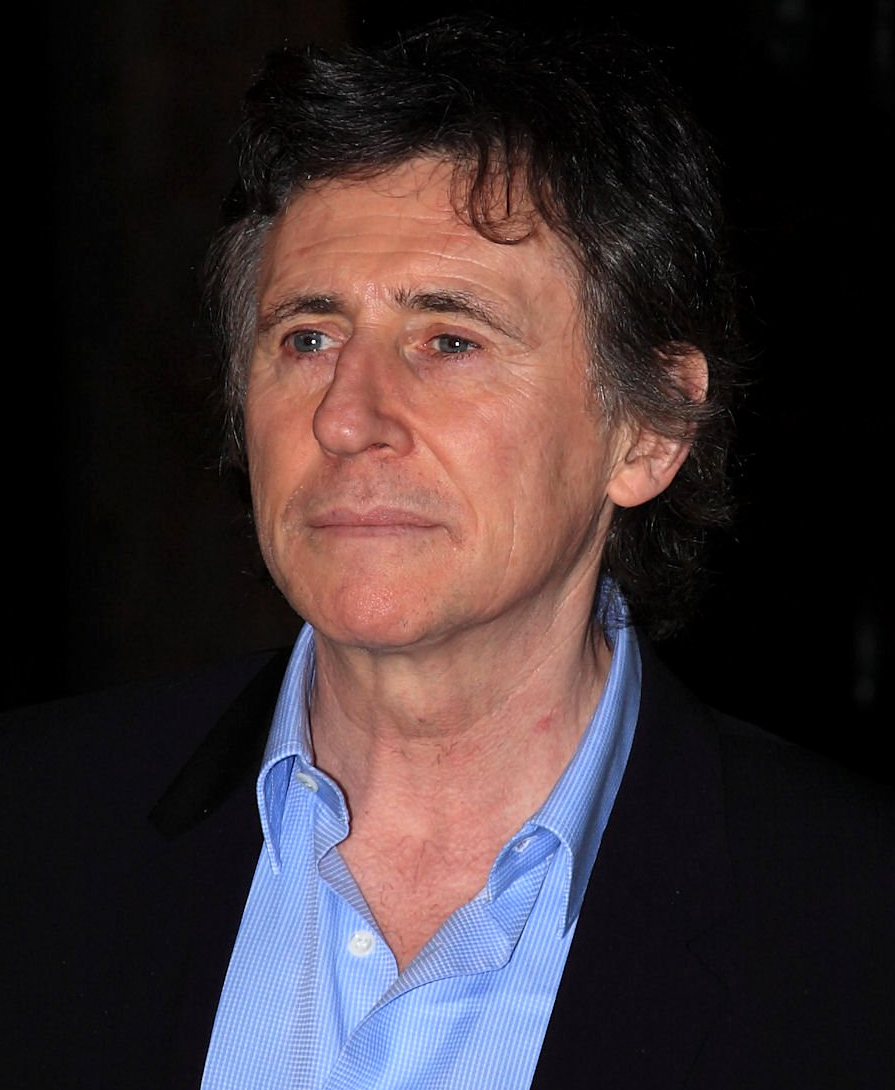
- Byrne in 2010
- Born: Gabriel James Byrne; 12 May 1950 (age 76); Dublin, Ireland
- Education: University College Dublin
- Occupation: Actor
- Years active: 1978–present
- Spouses: Ellen Barkin (m. 1988; div. 1999) Hannah Beth King (m. 2014)
- Children: 3

Gabriel James Byrne (born 12 May 1950) is an Irish actor. He has received a Golden Globe Award as well as nominations for a Grammy Award, two Primetime Emmy Awards and two Tony Awards. Byrne was awarded the Irish Film and Television Academy Lifetime Achievement Award in 2018 and was listed at number 17 on The Irish Times list of Ireland's greatest film actors in 2020. In 2009, The Guardian named him one of the best actors never to have received an Academy Award nomination.

Byrne's acting career began at the Focus Theatre in Dublin before he joined London's Royal Court Theatre in 1974. His screen debut came in the Irish drama serial The Riordans and the spin-off show Bracken. He went on to star in such films as Defence of the Realm (1986), Lionheart (1987), Miller's Crossing (1990), Little Women (1994), Dead Man (1995), The Usual Suspects (1995), The Man in the Iron Mask (1998), Enemy of the State (1998), End of Days (1999), Stigmata (1999), Vanity Fair (2004), The 33 (2015), and Hereditary (2018). He co-wrote The Last of the High Kings (1996) and also produced In the Name of the Father (1993).

For his Broadway work, Byrne has received two nominations for the Tony Award for Best Actor in a Play for his roles in the Eugene O'Neill plays A Moon for the Misbegotten (2000), and Long Day's Journey into Night (2016). For his television work, Byrne has received two nominations for the Primetime Emmy Award for Outstanding Lead Actor in a Drama Series for his role as Paul Weston in the HBO drama series In Treatment (2008–2010), he also received a Golden Globe Award. His other notable television roles include Vikings (2013), Maniac (2018), and War of the Worlds (2019–2022).

== Early life ==
Gabriel James Byrne was born on 12 May 1950 in Walkinstown, Dublin, Ireland, the son of Roman Catholic parents. His father Dan was a soldier and cooper, while his mother Eileen (née Gannon), from Elphin, County Roscommon, was a hospital nurse. He has five younger siblings: Donal, Thomas, Breda, Margaret, and a sister who died at an early age, Marian.

Byrne attended Ardscoil Éanna secondary school in Crumlin, where he later taught Spanish and history. He attended University College Dublin, where he studied archaeology, Spanish and linguistics, and graduated with a BA in 1972, becoming proficient in the Irish language. He went on to complete a Higher Diploma in Education (HDipEd) in 1973.

About his early training to become a priest, Byrne said in an interview, "I spent five years in the seminary and I suppose it was assumed that one had a vocation. I realised subsequently that I didn't."

Byrne played football in Dublin with Stella Maris.

In January 2011, Byrne spoke in an interview on The Meaning of Life about being sexually abused by priests during his childhood.

== Career ==
Byrne worked in archaeology when he left UCD. He maintained his love of his language, later writing the first television drama in Irish, Draíocht, on Ireland's national Irish-language television station, TG4, when it began broadcasting in 1996.

Before becoming an actor, Byrne had many jobs, including archaeologist, cook, Spanish and history school teacher at Ardscoil Éanna in Crumlin and even a spell as a bullfighter in Spain. He started acting at age 29, and began his career on stage with the Focus Theatre and the Abbey Theatre in Dublin. He later joined the Performing Arts Course at Roslyn Park College in Sandymount. He came to prominence on the final season of the Irish television show The Riordans, subsequently starring in his own spin-off series, Bracken. His first play for television was Michael Feeney Callan's Love Is ... (RTÉ). He made his film debut in 1981, as King Uther Pendragon in John Boorman's King Arthur epic, Excalibur.

In 1983, Byrne appeared with Richard Burton in the miniseries Wagner, co-starring Laurence Olivier, John Gielgud and Ralph Richardson. In 1985, he starred in the acclaimed political thriller Defence of the Realm, though he subsequently said he had been upstaged by his co-star, veteran actor Denholm Elliott: "I amended the actor's cliché to 'Never work with children, animals or Denholm Elliott'."

In 1990, Byrne starred as the protagonist Tom Reagan in the Coen Brothers 1929-set film Miller's Crossing, in which his character serves as an advisor to a crime boss while trying to keep the peace between the Irish and Italian mobs in Philadelphia. Despite the character being a member of the Irish mob, the Coens originally wanted Byrne to speak in an American accent rather than his native Irish. Byrne argued that his accent was a good fit for the dialogue, and the Coens eventually agreed, though they are known for rarely deviating from their original vision.

In 1995, Byrne starred as one of the main characters, Dean Keaton, in the crime thriller The Usual Suspects, written by Christopher McQuarrie and directed by Bryan Singer. When Byrne was initially approached with the script, he turned the offer down, thinking the filmmakers couldn't pull it off. When he met with McQuarrie and Singer in person, he was convinced of their abilities, then backed out again due to personal reasons. Finally, the production team agreed to shoot the picture in Los Angeles, and Byrne signed on for good.

In the 90s, his production company Plurabelle Films received a first look deal with Phoenix Pictures.

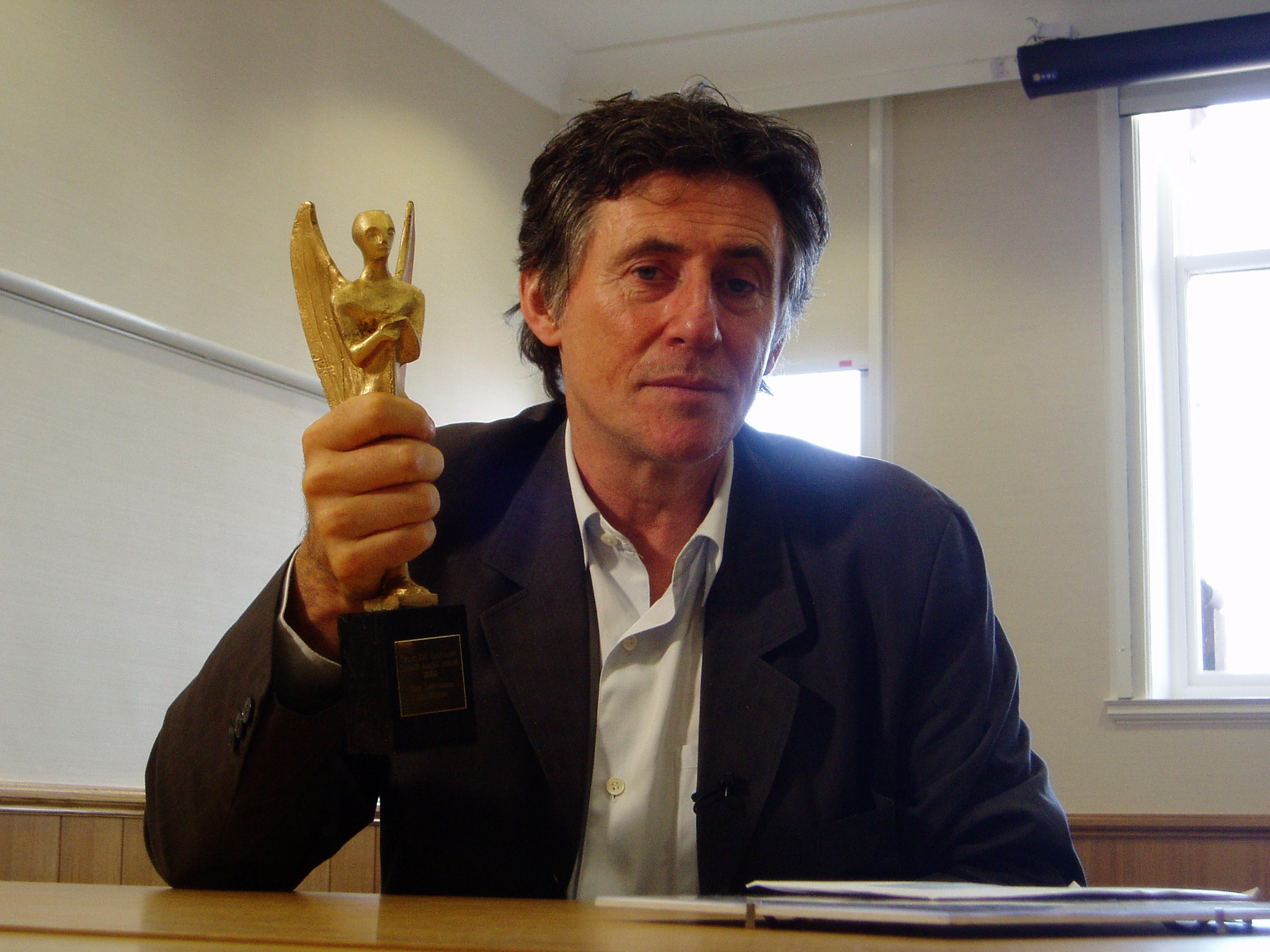
Byrne holding his Herald Angel, an award given to him at the 2006 Edinburgh International Film Festival.

In 2007, Byrne led the jury of the Kerry Film Festival.

Upon his return to theatre in 2008, Byrne appeared as King Arthur in Camelot with the New York Philharmonic from 7 to 10 May, following the footsteps of veteran actors Richard Burton and Richard Harris. Byrne was cast in a film adaptation of Flann O'Brien's metafictional novel At Swim-Two-Birds, alongside Colin Farrell and Cillian Murphy. Actor Brendan Gleeson was set to direct the film. In October 2009, however, Gleeson expressed fear that, should the Irish Film Board be abolished as planned by the Irish State, the production might fall through.

Byrne starred as therapist Paul Weston in the HBO series In Treatment from 2008 to 2010. He was named as TV's "latest Dr. McDreamy" by The New York Times for this role, and won the Golden Globe Award for Best Actor in a Drama Series in 2008.

In 2011, Byrne signed up to appear in a film by director Costa-Gavras, Le Capital, an adaptation of Stéphane Osmont's novel of the same name.

In 2017, Byrne appeared in Mad to Be Normal (previously titled Metanoia), a biopic of the Scottish psychiatrist R. D. Laing, produced by Gizmo Films.

In 2018, Byrne starred in filmmaker Ari Aster's feature debut Hereditary as Steve, the husband and father in a family experiencing occult disturbances following the death of his mother-in-law. It ranked 83rd on Rolling Stone's list of "The 100 Best Movies of the 21st Century" and 10th on The Hollywood Reporter's list of the "25 Best Horror Movies of the 21st Century." It was Byrne's second time working with Alex Wolff, who played his son, after In Treatment, and Wolff said, "He's the person that I've worked with who has probably inspired me the most," about Byrne in a profile by DuJour.

Walking with Ghosts, Byrne's one-man show based on his memoir of the same title (published by Grove Press in January 2021), premiered at the Gaiety Theatre, Dublin on 1 February 2022, before playing at the Edinburgh International Festival. It opened on 6 September 2022 at the Apollo Theatre in London, marking Byrne's West End debut at the age of 72, in 'a career-best performance', and opened on 26 October 2022 at the Music Box Theatre on Broadway.

== Personal life ==
Byrne had a 12-year relationship with television producer and presenter Aine O'Connor, from 1974 to 1986. He began a relationship with actress Ellen Barkin, and relocated to Manhattan to be with her. A year later, in 1988, he married Barkin, with whom he has two children. The couple separated amicably in 1993 and divorced in 1999. He later married Hannah Beth King on 4 August 2014 at Ballymaloe House in County Cork. As of 2021, Byrne lives with his family in Rockport, Maine.

At the fifth Jameson Dublin International Film Festival in 2007, Byrne was presented with the first of the new Volta awards, for lifetime achievement in acting. He received the Honorary Patronage of the University Philosophical Society, of Trinity College Dublin on 20 February 2007. In November 2007, he was awarded an honorary degree by the National University of Ireland, Galway; the president of the university, Iognáid Ó Muircheartaigh, said that the award was in recognition of the actor's "outstanding contribution to Irish and international film".

Byrne released a documentary for the 20th Galway Film Fleadh in the summer of 2008 called Stories from Home, an intimate portrait about his life. It premiered in the United States in September 2009 at the Los Angeles Irish Film Festival.

Byrne mentioned in interviews and his 1994 autobiography, Pictures in My Head that he hates being called "brooding". He has been listed by People as one of the "Sexiest Men Alive". Entertainment Weekly has also dubbed Byrne as one of the hottest celebrities over the age of 50.

Byrne is an atheist and has been vocally critical of the Catholic Church, which he described in a 2011 interview with The Guardian as "repressive of women and minorities and repressive of its followers". In the same interview, he said that he still reads the Bible "for the fables". Byrne has criticized the Church's influence in Ireland, it's historic opposition to Same-sex marriage, and it's ties to Nazi Germany. He has gone on to call the Catholic Church a "force for evil", and his comments have caused controversy in Ireland.

Byrne was cultural ambassador for Ireland until he criticised The Gathering, a tourism initiative to encourage people of Irish heritage to visit the country, describing it as "a scam" and adding that the majority of Irish people "don't give a shit about the diaspora except to shake them down for a few quid". Byrne also criticised the marketing strategy employed by Guinness known as Arthur's Day as "a cynical piece of exercise in a country which has a huge drinking problem".

== Filmography ==
=== Film ===
Year	Title	Role	Notes	Ref.
1978	On a Paving Stone Mounted	Unknown		
1981	Love Is ...	Larry		
1981	Excalibur	Uther Pendragon		
1983	Hanna K.	Joshua Herzog		
1983	The Keep	Sturmbannführer Erich Kämpffer		
1984	Reflections	William Masters		
1985	Defence of the Realm	Nick Mullen		
1986	Gothic	Lord Byron		
1987	Lionheart	The Black Prince		
1987	Hello Again	Dr. Kevin Scanlon		
1987	Julia and Julia	Paolo Vinci		
1987	Siesta	Augustine		
1988	The Courier	Val		
1989	A Soldier's Tale	Saul		
1989	Diamond Skulls	Lord Hugo Bruckton		
1990	Miller's Crossing	Tom Reagan		
1990	Shipwrecked	Lieutenant John Merrick		
1992	Into the West	Papa Reilly	Also associate producer	
1992	Cool World	Jack Deebs		
1993	Point of No Return	Bob	aka The Assassin	
1993	A Dangerous Woman	Colin Mackey		
1993	In the Name of the Father	—N/a	Executive producer	
1994	A Simple Twist of Fate	John Newland		
1994	Trial by Jury	Daniel Graham		
1994	Little Women	Professor Friedrich Bhaer		
1994	Prince of Jutland	Fenge		
1995	The Usual Suspects	Dean Keaton		
1995	Dead Man	Charlie Dickinson		
1995	Frankie Starlight	Jack Kelly		
1996	Mad Dog Time	Ben London		
1996	The Last of the High Kings	Jack Griffin	Also writer and executive producer	
1996	Somebody Is Waiting	Roger Ellis	Also executive producer	
1996	Dr. Hagard's Disease	Unknown	Unreleased; also executive producer	
1997	Smilla's Sense of Snow	The Mechanic		
1997	The End of Violence	Ray Bering		
1997	This Is the Sea	Rohan		
1998	Polish Wedding	Bolek		
1998	The Man in the Iron Mask	D'Artagnan		
1998	The Brylcreem Boys	Sean O'Brien	Also co-producer	
1998	Quest for Camelot	Sir Lionel (voice)		
1998	Enemy of the State	NSA Agent Fake Brill		
1999	Stigmata	Father Andrew Kiernan		
1999	End of Days	The Man / Satan		
2000	Canone inverso	The Violinist ('Jeno Varga')		
2000	Mad About Mambo	—N/a	Executive producer	
2002	Virginia's Run	Ford Lofton		
2002	Spider	Bill Cleg		
2002	Emmett's Mark	Jack Marlow / Stephen Bracken		
2002	Horses: The Story of Equus	Narrator (voice)		
2002	Ghost Ship	Captain Sean Murphy		
2003	Shade	Charlie Miller		
2003	Flight from Death	Narrator (voice)		
2004	Vanity Fair	The Marquess of Steyne		
2004	P.S.	Peter Harrington		
2004	The Bridge of San Luis Rey	Brother Juniper		
2005	Assault on Precinct 13	Captain Marcus Duvall		
2005	Wah-Wah	Harry Compton		
2006	Played	Eddie		
2006	Jindabyne	Stewart Kane		
2007	Emotional Arithmetic	Christopher Lewis		
2008	2:22	Detective Swain	Uncredited	
2009	Butte, America	Narrator (voice)		
2009	Perrier's Bounty	The Reaper (voice)		
2009	Leningrad	Phillip Parker		
2012	Le Capital	Dittmar Rigule		
2012	I, Anna	Detective Bernie Reid		
2013	Just a Sigh (Le Temps de l'aventure)	Doug		
2013	All Things to All Men	Joseph Corsco		
2014	Vampire Academy	Victor Dashkov		
2015	The 33	André Sougarret		
2015	Louder Than Bombs	Gene Reed		
2015	Nobody Wants the Night	Bram Trevor		
2016	Carrie Pilby	Mr. Daniel Pilby		
2016	No Pay, Nudity	Lawrence Rose		
2017	Mad to Be Normal	Jim		
2017	Lies We Tell	Donald		
2018	In the Cloud	Doc Wolff		
2018	An L.A. Minute	Ted Gold		
2018	Hereditary	Steve Graham	Also executive producer	
2018	Atlantic Salmon: Lost at Sea	Narrator (voice)		
2020	Lost Girls	Richard Dormer		
2020	Death of a Ladies' Man	Samuel O'Shea		
2022	Murder at Yellowstone City	Sheriff James Ambrose		
2022	Lamborghini: The Man Behind the Legend	Enzo Ferrari		
2022	The Boy, The Mole, The Fox And The Horse	The Horse (voice)	Short film	
2023	Dance First	Samuel Beckett		
2024	Four Letters of Love	Muiris Gore		
2025	Ballerina	The Chancellor		

Key
†	Denotes films that have not yet been released

=== Television ===
Year	Title	Role	Notes
1978–1979	The Riordans	Pat Barry	Drama series
1980–1982	Bracken	Pat Barry	Drama series
1981	Strangers	Johnny Maguire	Episode: "The Flowers of Edinburgh"
1981	The Search for Alexander the Great	Ptolemy	4 episodes
1982	Joyce in June	Keogh / Blazes Boylan	Television film
1983	Wagner	Karl Ritter	3 episodes
1985	Christopher Columbus	Christopher Columbus	4 episodes
1985	Mussolini: The Untold Story	Vittorio Mussolini	6 episodes
1993	Intimate Portrait	Narrator (voice)	Episode: "Kim Cattrall"
1994	Screen Two	The Good Thief	Episode: "All Things Bright and Beautiful"
1995	Buffalo Girls	Teddy Blue	Television film
1995	Saturday Night Live	Himself / Various Characters	Episode: "Gabriel Byrne/Alanis Morissette"
1996	Draíocht	Father	Television film
1997	Glenroe	Pat Barry	Episode: "Miley's New Bullock"
1997	Weapons of Mass Distraction	Lionel Powers	Television film
2000	Madigan Men	Ben Madigan	12 episodes; also co-executive producer
2008–2010	In Treatment	Dr. Paul Weston	106 episodes
2012	Secret State	Tom Dawkins	4 episodes
2013	Vikings	Earl Haraldson	6 episodes
2014	Quirke	Quirke	3 episodes
2016	Marco Polo	Pope Gregory X	Episode: "Let God's Work Begin"
2018	Maniac	Porter Milgrim	5 episodes
2019–2022	The War of the Worlds	Bill Ward	24 episodes
2020	ZeroZeroZero	Edward Lynwood	2 episodes

== Theatre ==
Year	Title	Role	Theatre	Ref.
2000	A Moon for the Misbegotten	James 'Jim' Tyrone, Jr.	Walter Kerr Theatre (Broadway)	
2002	The Exonerated	Kerry Max Cook (replacement)	Bleecker Street Theatre (Off-Broadway)	
2005	A Touch of the Poet	Cornelius Melody	Studio 54 (Broadway)	
2008	Camelot	King Arthur	Avery Fisher Hall	
2016	Long Day's Journey into Night	James Tyrone	American Airlines Theatre (Broadway)	
2022	Walking with Ghosts	Performer	Music Box Theatre (Broadway)	
2026	45 Years	Geoff Mercer	Minerva Theatre, Chichester	

== Accolades ==
Year	Award	Category	Title	Result	Ref.
1979	Jacob's Awards	Best Actor in a TV Series (Drama)	Bracken	Won	
1987	Fantasporto	Best Actor	Gothic / Defence of the Realm	Won	
1995	National Board of Review of Motion Pictures	Best Acting by an Ensemble	The Usual Suspects	Won	
1998	Satellite Awards	Best Actor in a Mini-Series or TV Movie	Weapons of Mass Distraction	Nominated	
1998	Grammy Awards	Best Spoken Word for Children	The Star-Child / The Nightingale and the Rose	Nominated	
1999	Cinequest Film Festival	Maverick Tribute Award		Won	
2000	Theatre World Awards	Best Acting	A Moon for the Misbegotten	Won	
2000	Tony Awards	Best Leading Actor in a Play	A Moon for the Misbegotten	Nominated	
2000	Razzie Awards	Worst Supporting Actor	End of Days / Stigmata	Nominated	
2000	Blockbuster Entertainment Awards	Favorite Actor (Horror)	Stigmata	Nominated	
2005	Irish Film and Television Awards	Best Lead Actor in a Feature Film	Wah-Wah	Nominated	
2006	Inside Film Awards	Best Actor	Jindabyne	Nominated	
2006	Australian Film Institute Awards	Best Lead Actor	Jindabyne	Nominated	
2006	Outer Critics Circle Awards	Outstanding Actor in a Play	A Touch of the Poet	Won	
2007	Jameson Dublin International Film Festival	Lifetime Achievement in Acting		Won	
2008	Irish Film and Television Awards	Best Lead Actor in a Feature Film	Jindabyne	Nominated	
2008	Primetime Emmy Awards	Outstanding Lead Actor in a Drama Series	In Treatment	Nominated	
2008	Dingle International Film Festival	Gregory Peck Excellence in the Art of Film Award		Awarded	
2008	Golden Globe Awards	Best Actor in a Television Series - Drama	In Treatment	Won	
2008	Satellite Awards	Best Actor in a Television Series – Drama	In Treatment	Nominated	
2009	Primetime Emmy Awards	Outstanding Lead Actor in a Drama Series	In Treatment	Nominated	
2016	Tony Awards	Best Leading Actor in a Play	Long Day's Journey into Night	Nominated	
2018	Irish Film and Television Awards	Lifetime Achievement Award	For his contribution to cinema	Received	
2021	Irish Film and Television Awards	Best Actor in a Leading Role - Film	Death of a Ladies' Man	Won	

Honours

In 2007, NUI Galway awarded him an honorary doctorate for his outstanding contribution to Irish and international film, theatre and the arts.

== Bibliography ==
- Pictures in My Head. Dublin: Wolfhound Press. 1994. ISBN 978-0-86327-462-6.
- Walking with Ghosts: A Memoir. New York: Grove Press. 2020. ISBN 978-0-8021-5712-6.
