= MGWR Class 7–12 =

Class of 6 Irish 2-4-0 locomotives

MGWR Class 7-12
Type and origin
- Power type: Steam
- Designer: Martin Atock
- Builder: Broadstone Works
- Build date: 1889—1890
- Total produced: 6
Specifications
- Configuration
  - Whyte: 2-4-0
Career
- Operators: MGWR
- Numbers: 7-12
- Withdrawn: 1922

The MGWR Class 7–12 were a set of six 2-4-0 locomotives introduced in 1889/90 by the Midland Great Western Railway (MGWR) of Ireland replacing the MGWR Class 18 with the same names and numbers. They were withdrawn from 1909 to 1922 with none surviving into service with Great Southern Railways (GSR). Their construction included iron frame plates, steel standard goods boilers, automatic brakes and a redesigned motion incorporating four slidebars. They were noted for economical coal consumption.

MGWR No.	Name	Introduced	Withdrawn
7	Connemara	1889	1909
8	St. Patrick	1890	1914
9	Emerald Isle	1890	1912
10	Faugh a Ballagh	1890	1910
11	Erin go Bragh	1889	1922
12	Shamrock	1890	1910
