= Island Road railway station (Ireland) =

Railway station in Ireland

Island Road

General information
- Location: Island Rd. Monasteraden, County Sligo; Ireland
- Coordinates: 53.938500°N 8.489056°W
- Distance: 5 miles (8.0 km) to Kilfree Junct.
- Platforms: 1
- Tracks: 1

History
- Opened: 1909
- Closed: 1963
- Original company: Midland Great Western Railway
- Pre-nationalisation: Great Southern Railways

Key dates
- 27/01/1947: Closed
- 24/05/1947: Reopened

Services
Preceding station	Disused railways	Following station
Kilfree Junction	Midland Great Western Railway; Ballaghaderreen branch line	Edmondstown
Location

Island Road railway station opened on 1 July 1909 as the second intermediate station on the Ballaghaderreen branch line from Kilfree Junction which had opened in 1874. It was single line with no passing loop with a station masters' house and small waiting room. The two armed lattice signal was notable. The station was situated alongside the gated level crossing on Island Road in the townland of Tawnymucklagh, about 1/2 mile from the village of Monasteraden.

The station is now in use as a private residence, with the waiting room, station house and platform largely intact.

In 2009 the pupils of St. Aiden's National School in Monasteraden, including one who was resident at the station at the time, produced a 32-minute movie entitled "The Train" bringing together rare footage and interviews with local people.
