= Ardscoil Éanna =

Ireland secondary school

Coordinates: 53°19′38″N 6°18′47″W

Ardscoil Éanna was a co-educational secondary school in Crumlin, Dublin, Ireland. It was established in 1939 by James J. O’Byrne, who had been interned in Frongoch in Wales for his role in the Easter Rising in 1916, and Margaret Pearse, sister of Patrick Pearse, who had founded Scoil Éanna (St Enda's) in Ranelagh in 1908.

It moved to its site, Franshaw House, in the early 1940s. It was the oldest school in the Crumlin area and one of only fifteen schools in Ireland under lay Catholic control. The last principal, Étaín Ní Mhórdha, was a granddaughter of the founder, while the Board of Management was chaired by his daughter and the school owner, Reiltín Ní Bhroin, then sister Eibhlín Ní Bhroin.

Until a fire in 2006, Ardscoil Éanna had a primary school, in the form of prefabs. Ardscoil Éanna secondary school closed its doors on 3 June 2016.

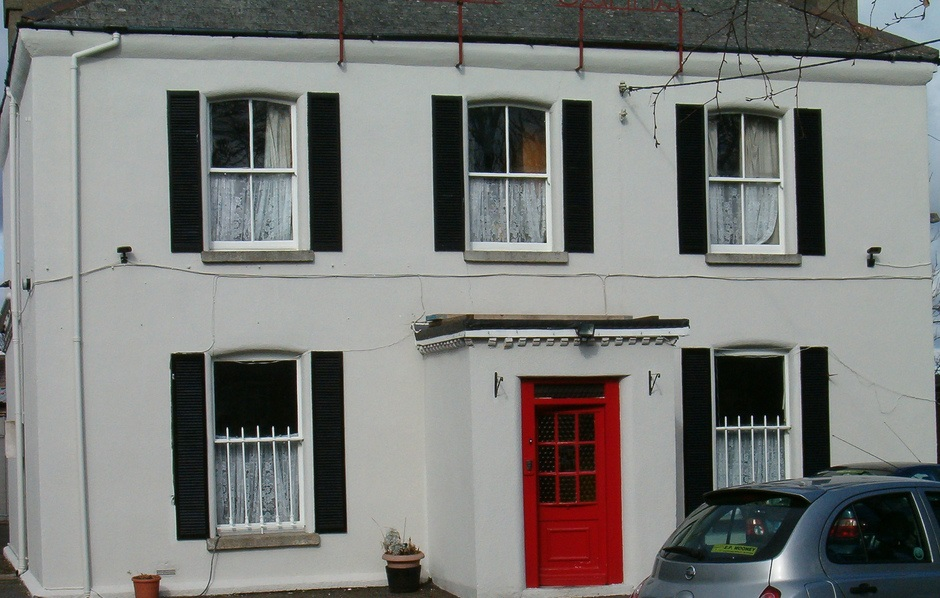
Franshaw House (formerly Ardscoil Éanna)

== Principals ==
There were five principals in Ardscoil Éanna's 70-year history: James J. O'Byrne; Réiltín Ní Bhroin; Mattie Moloney; Steven Kavanagh; and Étaín Ní Mhórdha.

== Famous alumni ==
Hollywood actor Gabriel Byrne, who returned as a teacher of Spanish and History in the school, attended Ardscoil Éanna as a student in the 1950s and 1960s. Byrne returned for the school's 70th anniversary celebrations where he was guest of honour among the 400 attendees. Johnny Murphy Abbey Stage Actor and Charlie Chapman singer with the Miami Showband were also past pupils.
