= John O'Gorman (piper) =

John O'Gorman (a.k.a. The blind piper of Roscommon), born 1860s, Irish piper.

O'Gorman was born in Ballaghaderreen when it was still part of County Mayo. Blind from childhood, he was taught by his kinsman, Patrick Vizard. His skills so charmed Lady De Freyne (mother of Arthur French, 5th Baron de Freyne that she purchased a pair of pipes for him, much superior to the set he had.

Captain Francis O'Neill said of him:

"O'Gorman was universally respected. Whenever any event of importance was coming off, the first thing to be done was to send after him in a side car, a conveyance in which he was taken home again when his engagement was ended. Generous and liberal with his music, he played for all who asked him; in fact, his whole soul was in the beloved instrument, which responded in seeming sympathy with his touch. In close lingering and "peppering,' he was an expert. The first prize awarded him at the Oireachtas in 1902 was no more than his due-George McCarthy and Denis Delaney getting second and third prizes, respectively. In 1908 O'Gorman did not fare so well, being defeated for first prize by Delaney."
