= Ballaghaderreen =

Town in County Roscommon, Ireland

Ballaghaderreen Bealach an Doirín
- Town
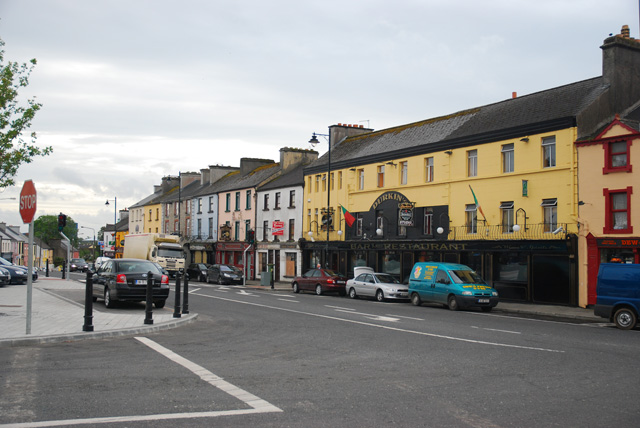
- Businesses on the square in Ballaghaderreen

- Location in Ireland
- Coordinates: 53°54′00″N 8°34′53″W
- Country: Ireland
- Province: Connacht
- County: County Roscommon

Population (2022)
  - Total: 2,387
- Time zone: UTC+0 (WET)
  - Summer (DST): UTC+1 (IST (WEST))
- Irish Grid Reference: M617948

Ballaghaderreen (Irish: Bealach an Doirín, meaning 'the way of the little oak grove') is a town in County Roscommon, Ireland. It was part of County Mayo until 1899. It is in the north-west of the county, near the borders with counties Mayo and Sligo, just off the N5 road. The population was 2,387 in the 2022 census.

== History ==
As of 1837, the town was recorded as having 1147 inhabitants in about 200 houses and as "rising in importance" as a post-town, being on the (then) new mail coach road from Ballina to Longford.

As of the mid-19th century, markets were held on Fridays, with seven fairs held throughout the year. A courthouse, market house and an infantry barracks to accommodate 94 persons had all been established by that time.

In 1860, Ballaghaderreen Cathedral was dedicated as the cathedral for the Roman Catholic Diocese of Achonry.

In March 2017, Ballaghaderreen became an Emergency Reception and Orientation Centre (EROC) for hundreds of refugees from the Syrian Civil War. In April 2018, the community was honoured with a People of the Year Award for welcoming the refugees into the community.

== Governance ==
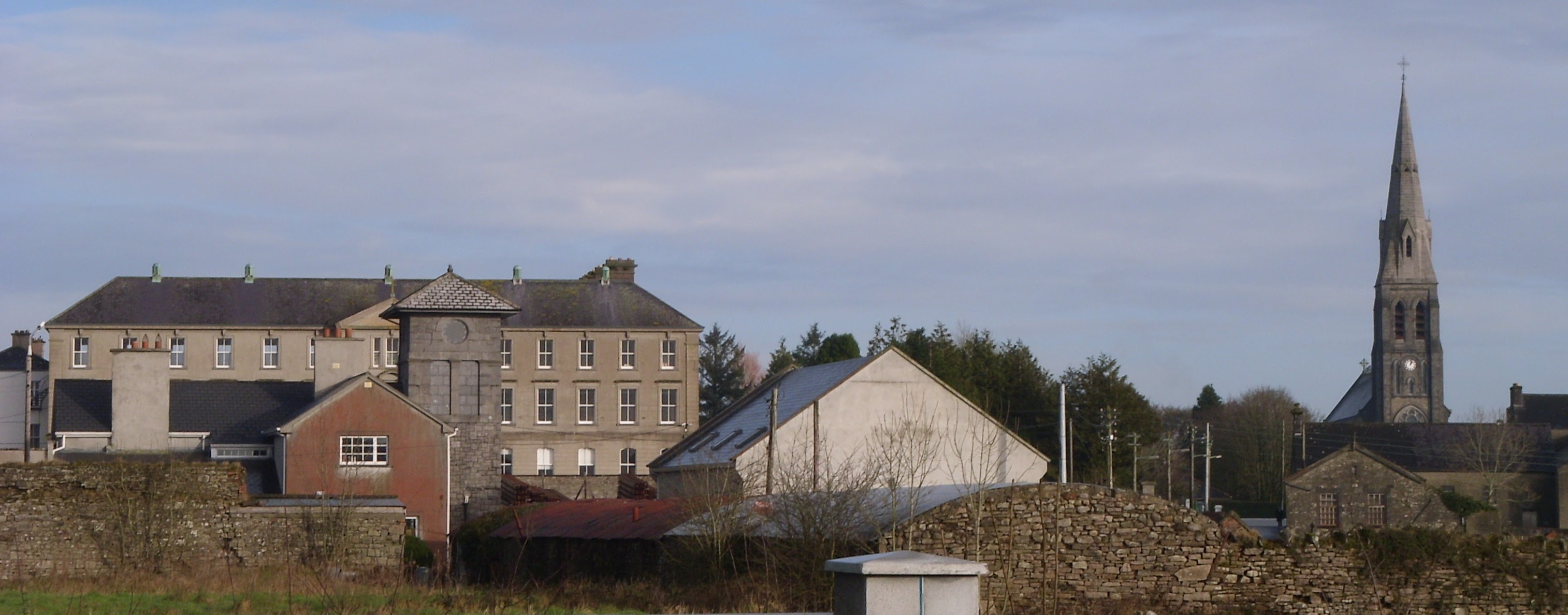
Ballaghaderreen in 2008

Ballaghadereen is part of the Barony of Costello and in the parish of Kilcoleman.

Ballaghaderreen has been part of County Roscommon since 1899 when the town and parish of Ballaghaderreen and Edmondstown were transferred from County Mayo in an order under the Local Government (Ireland) Act 1898. The local Gaelic Athletic Association team has remained affiliated with the Mayo GAA county board.

== Sports ==
The local Gaelic football club is Ballaghaderreen GAA. It is affiliated with the Mayo GAA county board.

Ballaghaderreen FC, the local association football (soccer) club, was founded in 1967.

== Transport ==
Ballaghaderreen was previously located on the N5 national primary road linking Longford to Westport. However, the town was bypassed in September 2014 with the re-routing of the N5 to the north of the town.

The nearest railway stations are in Castlerea (21 km) and Boyle (26 km). Ballaghaderreen was previously served by the Ballaghaderreen branch line from Kilfree Junction, with Ballaghaderreen railway station having opened on 2 November 1874 and closed permanently on 4 February 1963. The station house remains standing, in a state of severe dereliction, just off Station Road.

Ballaghaderreen is on the main Dublin–Ballina bus route and there are several buses daily serving this route. Ireland West Airport is 15 km to the west.

== People ==
- Anne Deane, nationalist, businesswoman and philanthropist
- John Blake Dillon, writer, politician, and founding member of the Young Ireland movement
- James Dillon, politician, leader of the opposition and leader of Fine Gael
- Dermot Flanagan, Gaelic footballer
- Thomas Flynn, Bishop of Achonry
- Pearce Hanley, Australian Rules footballer
- Garry Hynes, first female Tony Award winner for direction of a play
- Matt Molloy, Irish flute player
- Andy Moran, Gaelic footballer
- Patsy McGarry Irish Times journalist
- Máire McDonnell-Garvey, traditional Irish musician
- John O'Gorman, piper
- Brian O'Doherty, writer, artist, art critic and academic
- William Partridge, trade unionist and revolutionary socialist

== See also ==
- List of towns and villages in Ireland
