= Ballaghaderreen railway station =

Station in County Roscommon, Ireland

Ballaghaderreen

General information
- Location: Station Rd. Ballaghaderreen, County Roscommon; Ireland
- Coordinates: 53.900°N 8.580°W
- Platforms: 1
- Tracks: 1

History
- Opened: 1874
- Closed: 1963
- Original company: Sligo & Ballaghaderreen Junction Railway
- Pre-grouping: Midland Great Western Railway

Key dates
- 2 November 1874: Station opens
- 31 December 1875: Station closes
- 24 March 1876: Station reopens
- 27 January 1947: Station closes
- 24 May 1947: Station reopens
- 2 February 1963: Station closes

Services
Preceding station	Disused railways	Following station
Edmondstown	Midland Great Western Railway; Ballaghaderreen branch line	Terminus
Location

Ballaghaderreen railway station was a station which served Ballaghaderreen in County Roscommon, Ireland. It was the terminus of the branch line from Kilfree Junction.

== History ==
It was opened by the Sligo & Ballaghaderreen Junction Railway in 1874 and operated by the MGWR.

The station included a goods shed, engine shed, turntable, sidings and cattle pens. The unusual station building at Ballaghaderreen, of rough stone, remains, though very derelict. Part of the platform also survives. The goods shed, used by the GAA, remains complete with its typical long cattle bank platform. Since closure the water tower and single road engine shed have been demolished, their site replaced by a health centre. The terminus was unusual also for not having a signal cabin; the instruments were housed in the station building.

The station closed with the branch line in 1963.
