= Fossick & Hackworth =

- Industry: Engineering
- Founded: 1839
- Founder: George Fossick and Thomas Hackworth
- Headquarters: Stockton-on-Tees, England
- Products: Steam locomotives and marine engineering

Fossick & Hackworth was founded in 1839 by George Fossick and Thomas Hackworth (brother of Timothy Hackworth. The company was located in Norton Road, Stockton-on-Tees. The first locomotive was built in 1839 and, in its lifetime, the company built about 120 locomotives.

The Llanelly Railway took delivery of Victor, a 0-6-0 long boilered tender engine in 1864 (Wks No 176). This was subsequently sold to the Carmarthen & Cardigan Railway (C&CR) in December 1872. The C&CR amalgamated with the Great Western Railway on 1 July 1881, but Victor was not taken into GWR stock. It was moved to Swindon, and not scrapped until September 1889.

The company began to supply marine engines in 1853, and, after a while, marine engineering replaced railway work due to increased demand fueled by naval conflict throughout the world brought on by the rapid expansion of the British Empire. In 1855, George Young Blair (1826-1894) became manager of the company and, when Hackworth retired in 1864, Blair became a partner. The company then changed its name to Fossick, Blair and Company. Fossick retired in 1866 and Blair became the sole owner. The company name then changed to Blair and Company.

The company built approximately 120 locomotives.
