= Ballymote railway station =

Railway station in Ireland

Ballymote Baile an Mhóta
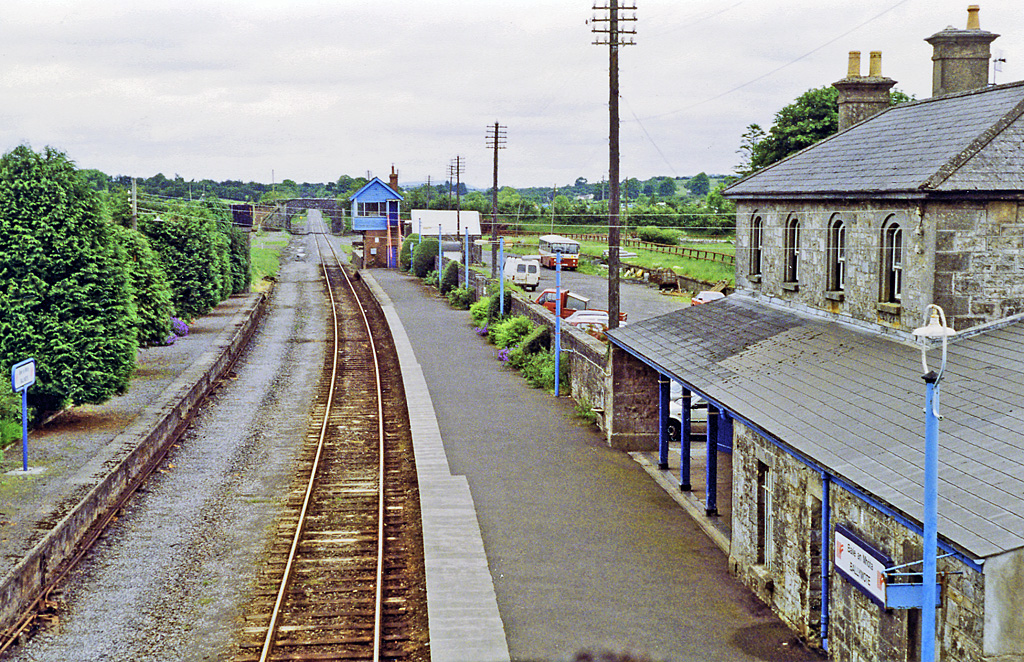
- Ballymote station in 1993 looking north towards Sligo. (Note: The 1993 image shows the track singled and goods shed demolished though the signal box remains. The goods yard is now a car park occupied by a CIÉ school bus. The cattle loading platform is evidenced in the top right quadrant.)

General information
- Location: Carrownanty, Ballymote, County Sligo, F56 F880; Ireland
- Coordinates: 54.08833°N 8.52112°W
- Owner: Iarnród Éireann
- Operator: Iarnród Éireann
- Platforms: 1 (formerly 2)
- Tracks: 1 (formerly 2)

Construction
- Structure type: At-grade

Other information
- Station code: BMOTE
- Fare zone: P

History
- Opened: 1862
- Original company: Midland Great Western Railway
- Pre-nationalisation: Great Southern Railways
Services
Preceding station	IÉ	Following station
Boyle	InterCity; Dublin-Sligo railway line	Collooney
Location

Ballymote railway station serves the town of Ballymote in County Sligo, Ireland.

== History ==
The station opened on 3 December 1862 with the Midland Great Western Railway extension from Longford to Sligo.

The current station building is listed and was believed to have been built around 1875.

A wall-mounted cast iron water fountain with the inscription "keep the pavement dry" was installed on the east platform around 1910. It is of skilled craftsmanship and the inscription is unusual.

The passing loop was removed at some point between 1985 and 1993 with the track only serving the up platform. (Note: Photographic images show both tracks present in 1985 but only a single track serving the platform in 1993.)

There was also a goods depot, shed and goods yard that have since been demolished.

== Accidents ==
On 2 August 1903, a double-headed passenger train for Sligo collided with the mail train for Dublin. Three passengers were injured. The investigation concluded the passenger train, whose main driver had been on shift for 20 hours, had gone through a stop signal resulting in a Collision - road incorrectly set. The lead engine also did not have its braking system correctly connected to the main engine.

== Awards ==
Ballymote was the winner of the National Best Station award in 2004.

== Notable people ==
Albert Reynolds was an Irish Taoiseach who formerly worked in the CIE accountancy office at Ballymote dealing with the various accounts in the town sending or receiving goods by train.

== Gallery ==
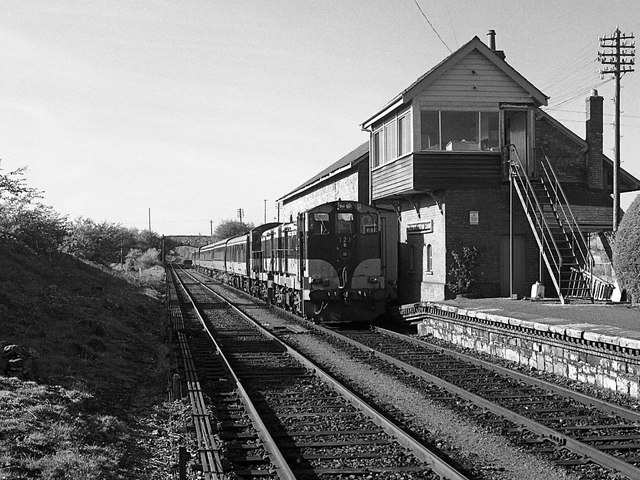
Train pulled by 121 Class locomotives entering Ballymote from Sligo in 1985 showing the now demolished signal box and goods depot

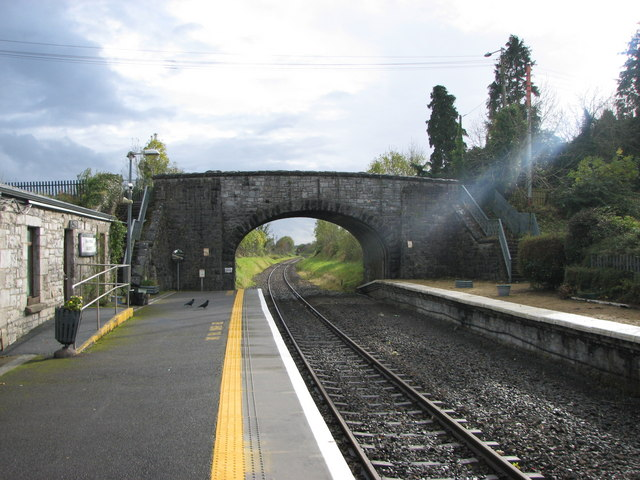
Looking south in 2009. The bridge is the R296 road to Tubbercurry. The steps to the now disused down platform were the only means of access.

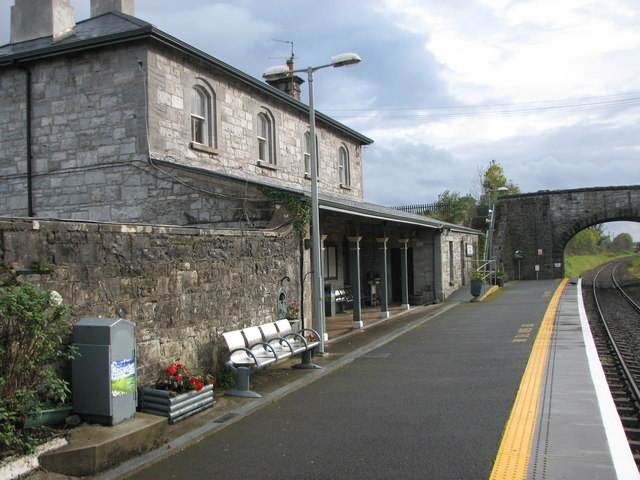
The listed station house building which dates from 1875

== See also ==
- List of railway stations in Ireland
