= Coolavin =

Coolavin Cúl ó bhFionn (Irish)
- Barony
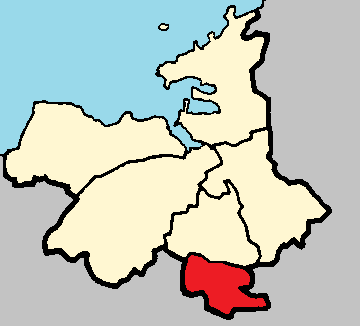
- Country: Ireland
- Province: Connacht
- County: Sligo

Area
  - Land: 103.1 km^{2} (39.8 sq mi)

Population (2016)
  - Total: 1,911
  - Density: 18.5/km^{2} (48/sq mi)

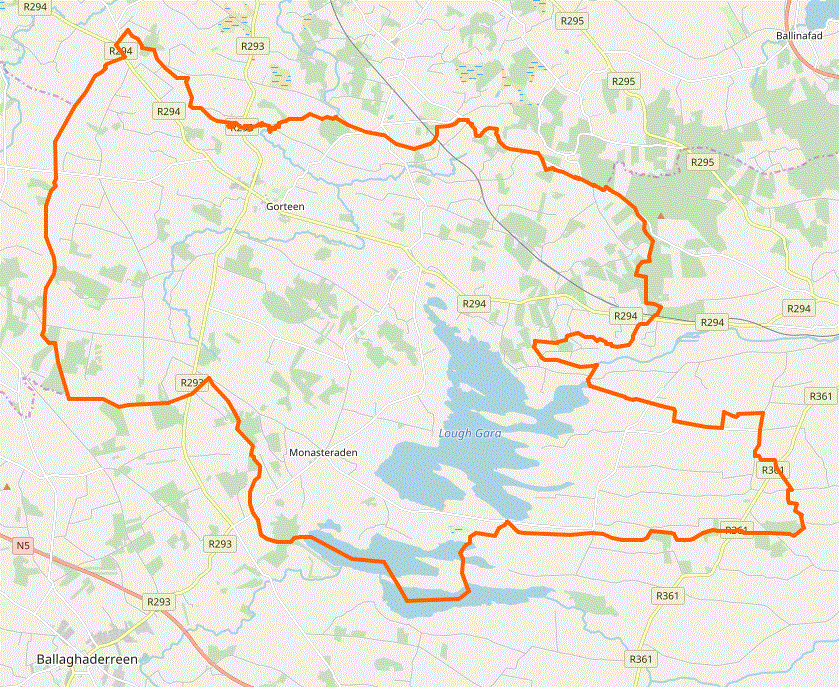
Map of Barony of Coolavin

Coolavin (Irish Cúl ó bhFionn) is a historical barony in south County Sligo, Ireland. It was created from the ancient túath of An Corann.

The O'Garas were originally Lords of Coolavin. They were succeeded by the MacDermotts, a family of the Milesian clans, who still claim their head to be the Prince of Coolavin to this day.
