= Boyle railway station =

Railway station in Ireland

Boyle Mainistir na Búille
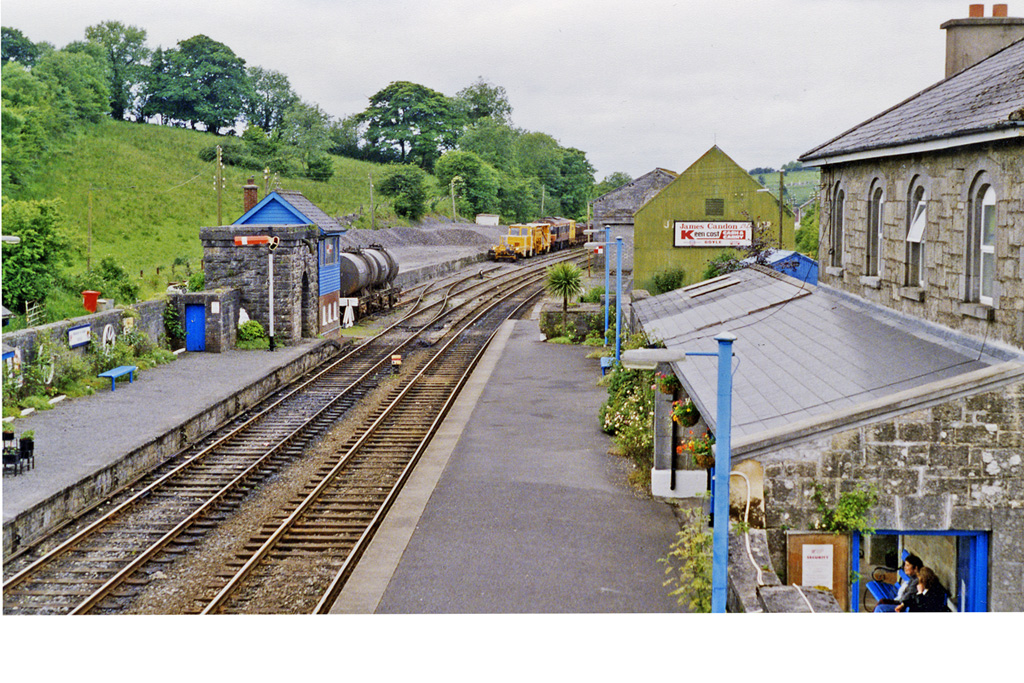

General information
- Location: Station Road, Boyle, County Roscommon, F52 N603; Ireland
- Coordinates: 53°58′3″N 8°18′15″W
- Owner: Iarnród Éireann
- Operator: Iarnród Éireann
- Platforms: 2

Construction
- Structure type: At-grade

Other information
- Station code: BOYLE
- Fare zone: N

Key dates
- 1862: Station opened
- 2026: Station upgraded
Services
Preceding station	IÉ	Following station
Carrick-on-Shannon	InterCity; Dublin-Sligo railway line	Ballymote
Location

Boyle railway station serves the town of Boyle in County Roscommon, Ireland.

== History ==
The station opened on 3 December 1862. Shepherd describes it as "an important station" with goods facilities including that for loading grain.

A footbridge with lifts and other station improvements were completed in 2026.

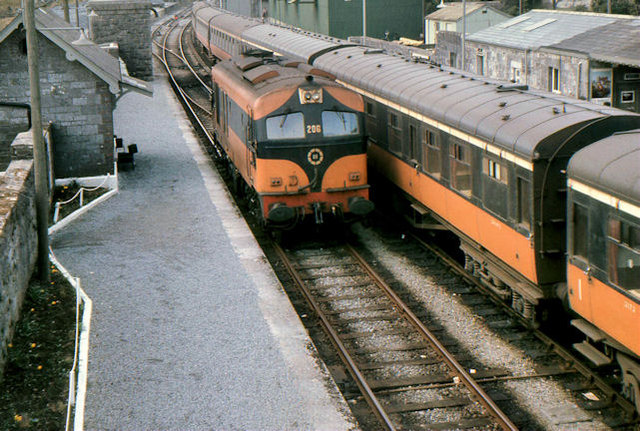
Boyle railway station with a CIE 201 Class in 1975.

== See also ==
- List of railway stations in Ireland

== Sources ==
- Shepherd, W. Ernest (1994). The Midland Great Western Railway of Ireland: An Illustrated History. Leicester: Midland Publishing. ISBN 1-85780-008-7. OCLC 32627031.
