= R572 road (Ireland) =

Regional road in Ireland

R572 road
- Bóthar R572
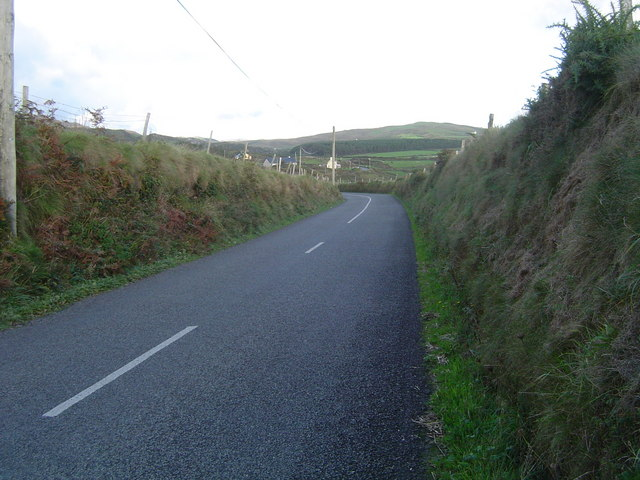
- R572 at Cahermore, County Cork

Route information
- Length: 55.4 km (34.4 mi)

Major junctions
- From: N71 at Glengarriff, County Cork
- R574 at Derreen; R571 at Castletown Bearhaven; R575 at Killough East
- To: Dursey Sound

Location
- Country: Ireland

Highway system
- Roads in Ireland; Motorways; Primary; Secondary; Regional
← R571	→ R573

The R572 road is a regional road in Ireland. It is a road on the Beara Peninsula in County Cork. The road forms part of the Wild Atlantic Way. Parts of the road are on the Beara Way walking trail.

The R572 travels west from the N71 to Adrigole along Bantry Bay. The Caha Mountains, and in particular Sugarloaf Mountain, are on the landward side of the road. West of Adrigole, Hungry Hill rises to 686 m (2,251 ft), the Caha Mountains' highest peak, and features a 214 m (702 ft) water cascade. The road continues to Castletown Bearhaven, a fishing port and former British naval base. The road ends at Crow Head on Dursey Sound, where Ireland's only cable car connects the mainland to Dursey Island. The R572 is 55.4 km (34.4 mi) long.
