= R571 road (Ireland) =

Road in Ireland

Coordinates: 51.796767°N 9.739137°W

R571 road
- Bóthar R571
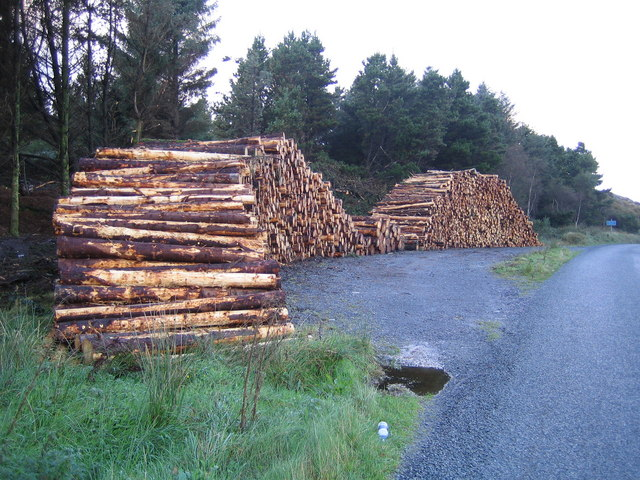
- Cut timber by the R571 at Foildarrig.

Route information
- Length: 35.4 km (22.0 mi)

Major junctions
- From: R572 Castletownbere
- Crosses Kealincha River; R575 Eyeries; Passes through Ardgroom; Enters County Kerry; Crosses Drumminboy River and Glantrasna River; R573 Derreen; R574 Derreen; R573 Derrylough; Crosses Cloonnee River
- To: N71 Kenmare

Location
- Country: Ireland

Highway system
- Roads in Ireland; Motorways; Primary; Secondary; Regional

The R571 road is a regional road in Ireland, located in County Cork and County Kerry.
