= R573 road (Ireland) =

Road in Ireland

R573 road
- Bóthar R573
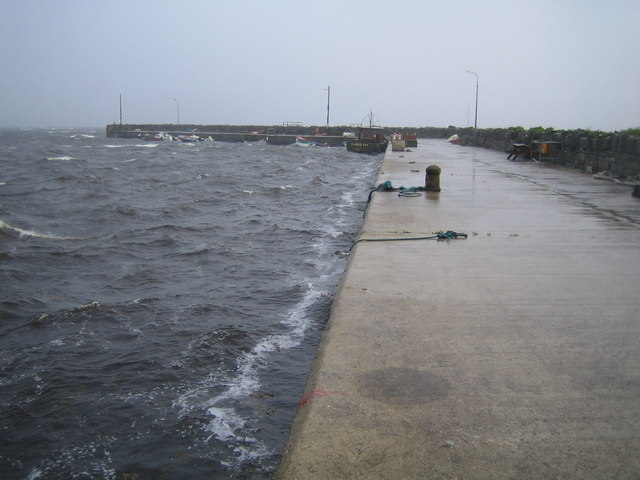
- Bunaw Quay, County Kerry, on the R573

Route information
- Length: 11.0 km (6.8 mi)

Major junctions
- From: R571 at Derrylough, County Kerry
- To: R571 at Derreen

Location
- Country: Ireland

Highway system
- Roads in Ireland; Motorways; Primary; Secondary; Regional
← R572	→ R574

The R573 road is a regional road in Ireland. It is a coastal loop road from the R571 on the Beara Peninsula in County Kerry. Part of the road is on the Wild Atlantic Way.

The R573 travels west from the R571 via Tuosist. The road continues along the coast, via Bunaw Quay and Derreen Garden to rejoin the R571 at Lauragh. The R573 is 11.0 km (6.8 mi) long.
