= R572 road =

R572 road may refer to:

- R572 road (Ireland)
- R572 road (South Africa)
