= Hungry Hill (novel) =

1943 novel by Daphne du Maurier

- First UK edition
- Author: Daphne du Maurier
- Language: English
- Genre: Historical novel
- Publisher: Gollancz (UK); Doubleday (US)
- Publication date: 1943
- Publication place: United Kingdom
- Media type: Print (Hardback & Paperback)
- OCLC: 8830337

Hungry Hill is a novel by British author Daphne du Maurier, published in 1943. It was her seventh novel. There have been 33 editions of the book printed.

This family saga is based on the history of the Irish ancestors of Daphne du Maurier's friend Christopher Puxley. The family resembles the Puxleys who owned mines in Allihies, a parish in County Cork.

The story spans the century from 1820 to 1920 following five male characters from a family of Anglo-Irish landowners, the Brodricks, who live in a castle called Clonmere. It is divided into five sub-books and an epilogue. Each section covers part of the life of an heir. The sections include: Book One: Copper John, 1820 - 1828; Book Two: Greyhound John, 1828 - 1837; Book Three: "Wild Johnnie," 1837 - 1858; Book Four: Henry, 1858 - 1874; Book Five: Hal, 1874 - 1895; Epilogue: The Inheritance, 1920;

The title sometimes is thought to refer to Hungry Hill which is the highest peak in the Caha Mountains in County Cork, and du Maurier's description of the Hungry Hill is similar to the physical aspects of that place. Rather than simply referring to the hill, however, the title alludes to the curse put on the family by Morty Donovan, arch enemy of patriarch Copper John Brodrick, at the start of the novel, and the fact that the mines seem to "swallow up" the lives of the Brodrick family through five generations, by early death, dissipation and unhappiness.

Many of the place names in the novel are imaginary, and the location is never directly stated to be Ireland, although it can be inferred from several references to "crossing the water" to reach London, Hal's embarkation from Liverpool en route to Canada, and, in the Epilogue, the Irish War of Independence (1919–1921).

The story was made into a film in 1947 directed by Brian Desmond Hurst

== Latest edition ==
- du Maurier, Daphne (2008). Hungry Hill. London: Virago. ISBN 978-1-84408-452-4.

== See also ==
- Hungry Hill
- Castletownbere
