= R575 road =

R575 road may refer to:

- R575 road (Ireland)
- R575 road (South Africa)
