= R574 road (Ireland) =

Road on the Beara Peninsula, Ireland

Coordinates: 51.722192°N 9.757088°W

R574 road
- Bóthar R574
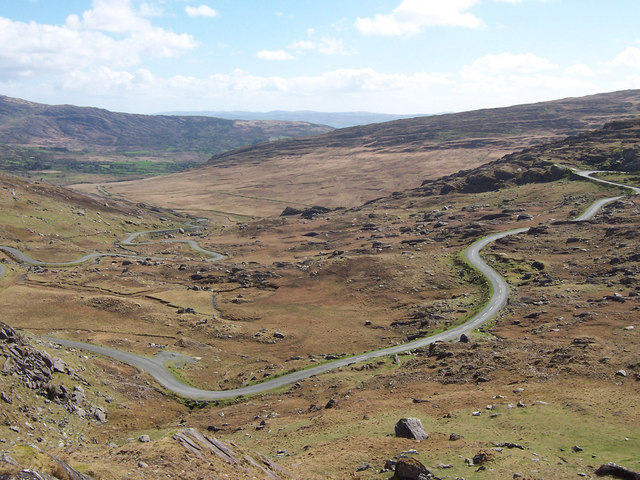
- Cork side of Healy Pass

Location
- Country: Ireland

Highway system
- Roads in Ireland; Motorways; Primary; Secondary; Regional

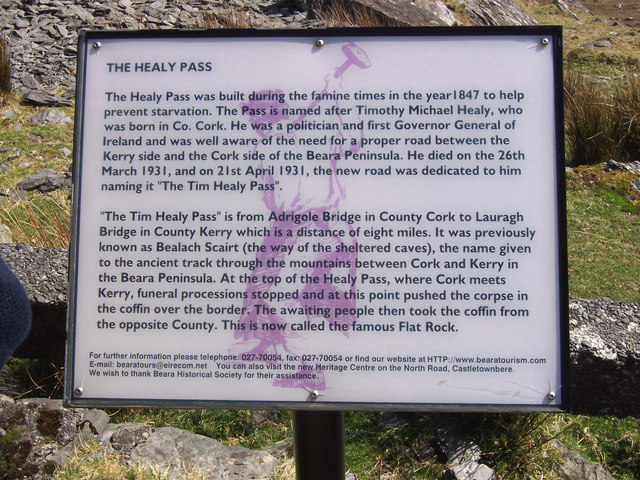
Historical information plaque

The R574 is an Irish regional road in the Beara peninsula which crosses the Caha Mountains via (Tim) Healy Pass. It runs from the R572 at Adrigole in County Cork to the R571 near Lauragh in County Kerry. It is a popular tourist route, with the pass at an elevation of 300 m giving panoramas towards Bantry Bay to the southeast and the Kenmare River to the northwest.

The original track, called the Kerry Pass, was cut during the Great Famine as a poor relief public works project. It was renamed for Tim Healy, Governor-General of the Irish Free State, who died in 1931 shortly after the road was improved. The name "Healy Pass" is now also applied to the pass itself, previously called Ballaghscart or Ballyscarta, anglicisations of Irish: Bealach Scairte, which remains its Irish name.

== Famine roads ==
Famine roads have been described as "a landscape legacy of often well-intentioned, but hopelessly misguided, initiatives".

They were part of a project initially conceived by Robert Peel's Conservative government to improve infrastructure in Ireland and thereby strengthen the economy, while at the same time providing paid employment for those without other means of sustenance following the failure of the potato crop in 1845.

The scheme was not executed as initially envisaged, and road improvement schemes predominated. Funding arrangements were ill-conceived. The treasury's object was to have the schemes funded at county level, but there was also a 'half-grant system'. Inevitably, this led to government officials suspecting landowners of lining their own pockets.

Under Trevelyan's stewardship from August 1846, ideology infused the administration of the relief works. He was determined to avoid the encouragement of what he saw as laziness in the workers and self-interest in the landed class. In order to achieve the former, he introduced payment by task rather than per diem, a scheme which was fraught with problems. To prevent landowners gaining from the work, the 'reproductive' benefit envisaged by Peel was abandoned. The Board of Works took sole charge and became an unwieldy bureaucracy.

Lack of tools, the malnutrition of the workers, appalling weather in the winter/spring of 1846/7, starvation wages (which could be as little as threepence-halfpenny a day), delays in payment, official suspicion that local officers were not sufficiently draconian in minimising the numbers employed, and the fact that the schemes were not preventing the ever-increasing distress of the people eventually led to their abandonment.

In October 1846, Denis McKennedy of County Cork died by the road on which he was working. He was owed two weeks' wages. The Board of Works was found culpable of gross negligence leading to his starvation. This was not an isolated case.

Famine roads have found their way into literature. Anthony Trollope's narrator in Castle Richmond (1860), set in County Cork, found humour in the sight of "thirty or forty wretched-looking men [...] clustered together in the dirt and slop and mud, on the brow of the hill, armed with such various tools as each was able to find. [...] They were [...] half-clad, discontented, with hungry eyes". The glib tone and racist disparagement with which he continues this description of coming upon a relief works party at the side of a remote hill can perhaps be explained by his genre and target English audience.

Trollope makes a useful contribution to the understanding of the road-building schemes in action in his description of the arrival of the English 'engineer', for whom the workers have been waiting since assembling seven hours previously as instructed, before daybreak. The engineer, sent to direct the work, is "a very young fellow, still under one-and-twenty, beardless, light-haired, blue-eyed, and fresh from England". The engineer does not know where he is and sends the men home, noticing that they have no tools.

Trollope, reflecting with irony on the ideology behind the scheme, states that no doubt the men will be put to work flattening the hill, and making the road impassable. "But the great object was gained; the men were fed, and were not fed by charity".

In George Moore's short story, A Play-House in the Waste, a priest reflects that "the policy of the Government [...] from the first was that relief works should benefit nobody except the workers, and it is sometimes very difficult to think out a project for work that will be perfectly useless. Arches have been built on the top of hills, and roads that lead nowhere. [..m] I can tell you it is difficult to bring even starving men to engage on a road that leads nowhere". In another story, A Letter to Rome, Moore returns to the same topic, a priest lamenting that the building of useless roads is "a wanton humiliation to the people".

The excavation of a famine road, near Enniskillen, was featured in Episode 9, Series 6 of the BBC archaeology programme Digging for Britain, and included an assessment of the policy by Onyeka Nubia of the University of Nottingham.
