= R573 road =

R573 road may refer to:

- R573 road (Ireland)
- R573 road (South Africa)
