= Adrigole =

Village in County Cork, Ireland

Adrigole Eadargóil
- Village
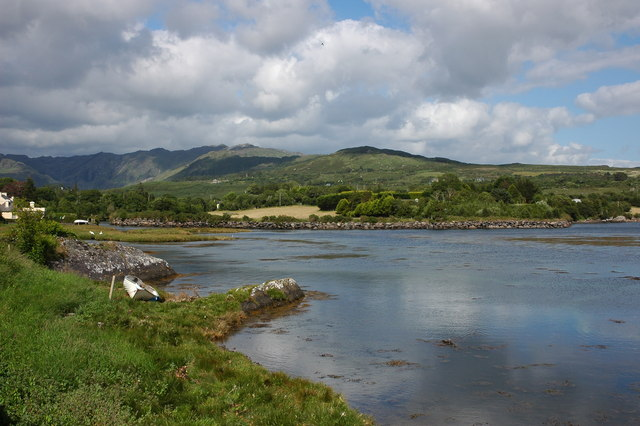
- Coast of Adrigole

- Location in Ireland
- Coordinates: 51°41′34″N 9°43′33″W
- Country: Ireland
- Province: Munster
- County: County Cork

Population (2022)
  - Total: 497
- (Includes local electoral district)
- Time zone: UTC+0 (WET)
  - Summer (DST): UTC-1 (IST (WEST))

Adrigole (Irish: Eadargóil, meaning 'between two inlets') is a village on the Beara Peninsula in County Cork, Ireland. It is centred on the junction of the R572 and R574 regional roads. As of the 2022 census, the electoral division in which the village sits had a population of about 500 people.

Adrigole is a scattered village strung approximately 9 km along the north-western shore of Bantry Bay on the scenic south coast of the Beara Peninsula. Looming over it is Hungry Hill (687m, 2,253 ft) with two rock-girt lakes which feed a cascade. Hungry Hill is the highest of the Caha range which forms the spine of the peninsula, and gave its name to Daphne du Maurier's eponymous novel about the local copper-mining barons of the 19th century. There is also Adrigole Mountain and the Healy Pass (334m) nearby.

== Amenities and economy ==
The main industries in the area are fishing, farming, and tourism. The village has a shop known locally as "Peg's Shop", now The Pass, which also offers limited postal services. There are also two pubs and a Catholic parish church. The area is served by two national schools, one at the junction of the Healy Pass Road R574 and the main Glengarriff - Castletownbere road R572, and the other further to the north east at Trafrask.

== History ==
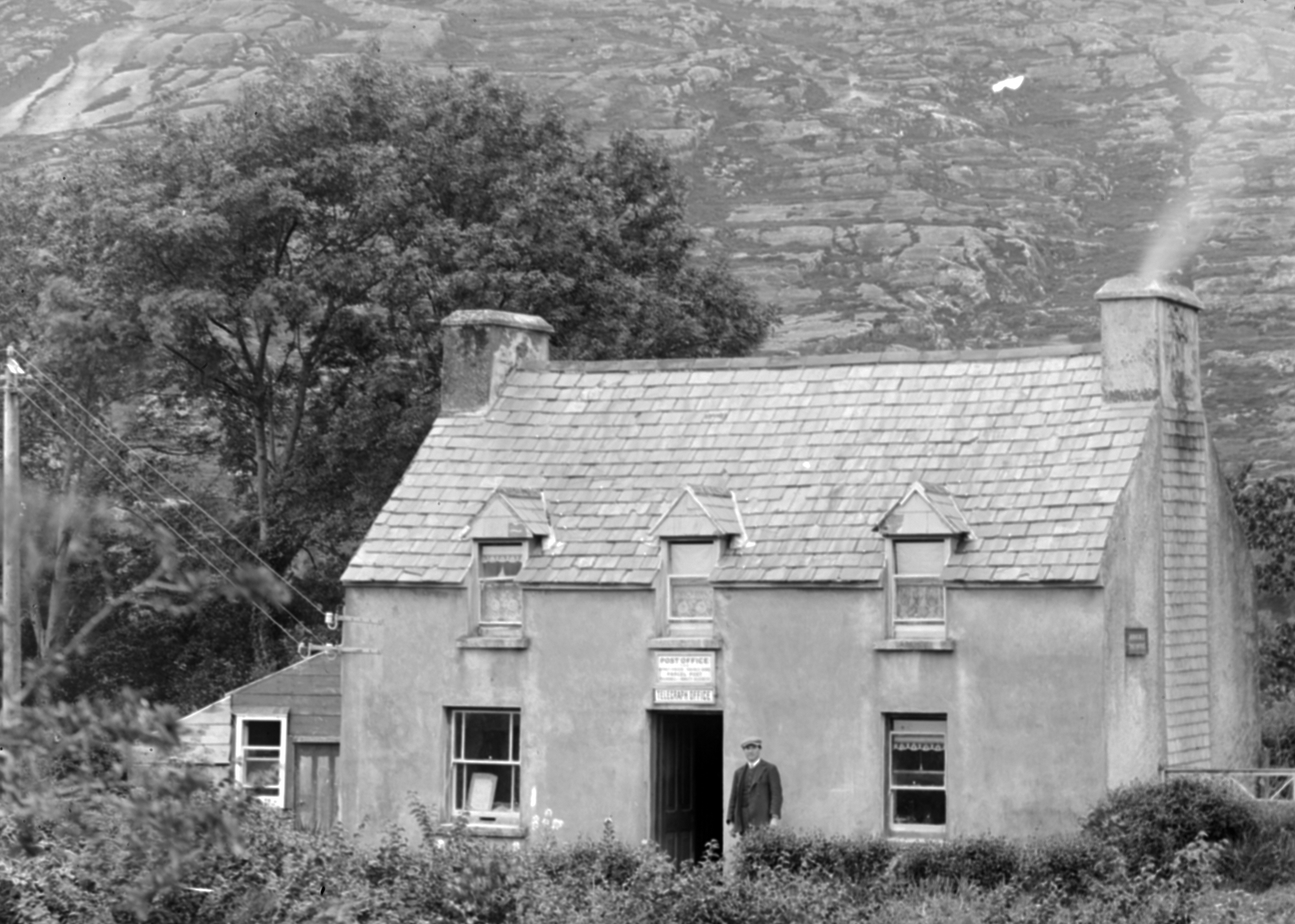
Adrigole telegraph office in the early 20th century

In the last week of March 1927 Daniel O'Sullivan, his wife and two of his children were found dead in their home at Clashduff, Adrigole. They had starved to death. This inspired Peadar O'Donnell to write his play Adrigoole, with the setting moved to Donegal.

== Sport ==
The local GAA pitch has an all-weather practice field as well as the main pitch and a clubhouse. The local GAA team is Adrigole GAA Club, which won the Cork Intermediate Football Championship in 1979. Adrigole also won the Cork Junior Football Championship in November 2006, beating Grenagh 0–5 to 0–3 in Páirc Uí Rinn.

Local sportsman Brendan (Ger) O'Sullivan has represented both his county in Gaelic football, and his country in International rules football.

== See also ==
- List of towns and villages in Ireland
