= R575 road (Ireland) =

Road in Ireland

R575 road
- Bóthar R575
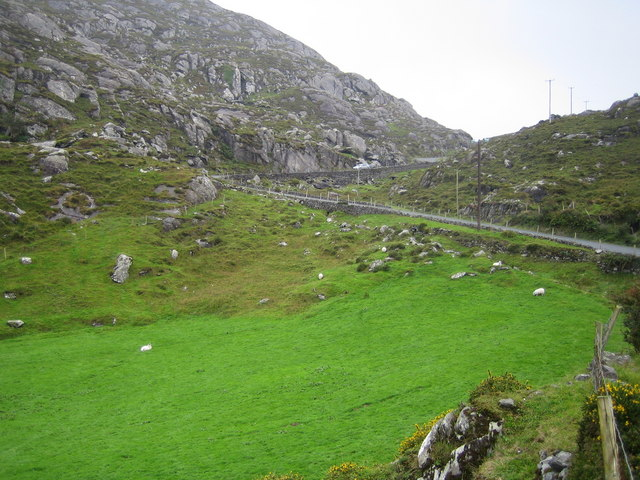
- R575 at Reentrusk, County Cork

Route information
- Length: 19.0 km (11.8 mi)

Major junctions
- From: R572 at Killough East, County Cork
- To: R571 at Inches

Location
- Country: Ireland

Highway system
- Roads in Ireland; Motorways; Primary; Secondary; Regional
← R574	→ R576

The R575 road is a regional road in Ireland. It is a road on the Beara Peninsula in County Cork. The road forms part of the Wild Atlantic Way. Parts of the road form part of the Beara Way walking trail.

Hillsides by the road near Allihies are marked by ruins of former copper mines. The mines were at peak production in the 19th century but some were operational until 1962.

The R575 travels northeast from the R572 via Allihies and along the Kenmare River inlet. The road ends at the R571 near Eyeries. The R575 is 19.0 km (11.8 mi) long.
