= Kenmare River =

Bay (not a river) in the southwest of Ireland

- Kenmare Bay, Inbhear Scéine
- An Ribhéar (Irish)
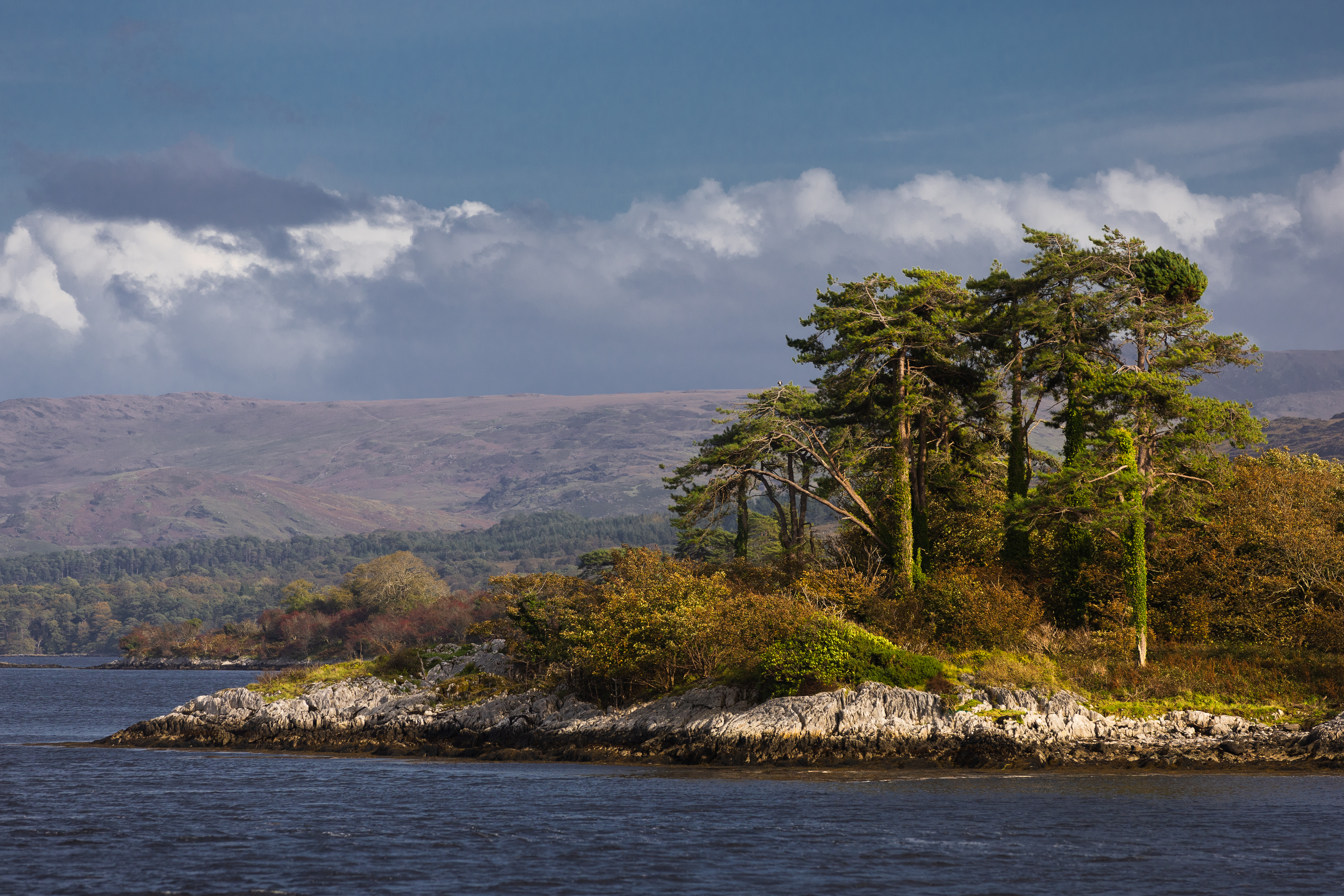
- Kenmare River, view from the north towards south-east, with Beara Peninsula visible in the background

- Location in Ireland
- Location: County Kerry and County Cork
- Coordinates: 51.84458°N 9.72334°W
- Type: bay
- Part of: North Atlantic Ocean
- Primary inflows: Roughty River
- River sources: Roughty, Sheen, Slaheny, Blackwater
- Ocean/sea sources: North Atlantic Ocean
- Basin countries: Ireland
- Designation: Special Area of Conservation (SAC)
- Max. length: approx. 50 kilometres (31 mi)
- Max. width: approx. 10 kilometres (6.2 mi)
- Settlements: Kenmare, Sneem, Lauragh, Eyeries

Kenmare River or Kenmare Bay (Irish: An Ribhéar, meaning 'river-mouth estuary' or Bá Neidíneach, 'the bay of Neidín') is a long and narrow bay in south-west Ireland. The bay is enclosed by the Iveragh Peninsula on the north side, and the Beara Peninsula on the south, with most of its shores belonging to County Kerry, except for a small south-western part which belongs to County Cork. At its head is the small town of Kenmare.

The bay is a drowned glacial valley with Old Red Sandstone bedrock. There are many small islands within the bay, including Dunkerron Islands, Greenane Islands, Rossdohan, Garinish, Inishkeragh, Illaunamadan, Sherky, Inishfarnard, Illaunleagh, and Illaunslea (Oileán Sléibhe).

== Name ==
Despite its name, Kenmare River is a body of salt water, and is alternatively called Kenmare Bay. The use of the term "river" was historically enforced by Lansdowne lords in order to retain fishing rights, and it was later retained by cartographers. The bay is fed by an actual river, Roughty River (An Ruachtach), at the very junction of Iveragn and Beara peninsulas, just south of Kenmare. The traditional Irish name of the bay was Inbhear Scéine, from the Irish inbhear meaning 'estuary', which is recorded in the 11th century narrative Lebor Gabála Érenn as the arrival point of the Irish mythological ancestor Partholón.

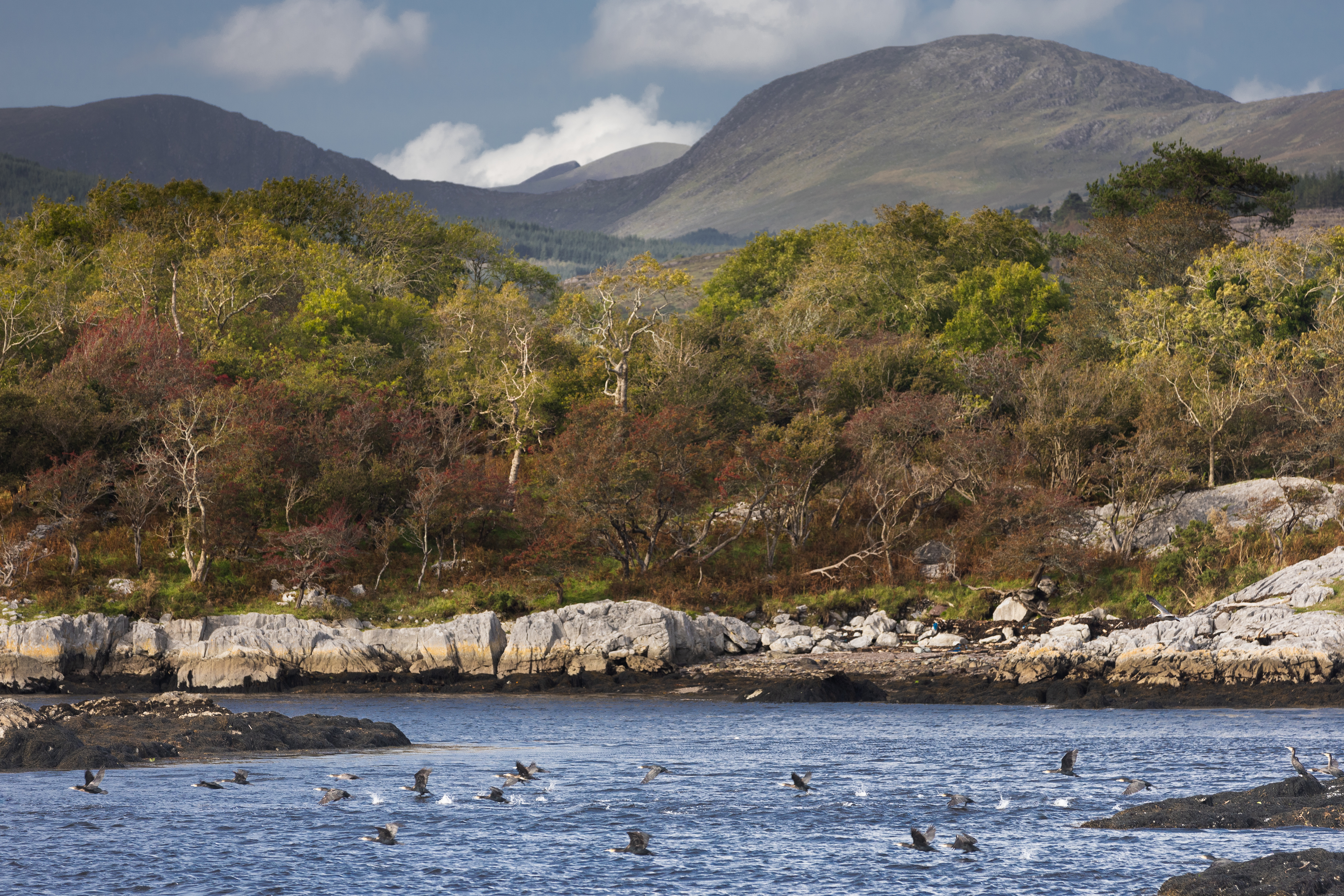
Cormorants flying by the northern shore of Kenmare River, with Dunkerron Mountains in the background

== Nature and conservation ==
Kenmare River and the surrounding areas are a sanctuary to wild salmon and a home to many other species, including narrow-mouthed whorl snail, lesser horseshoe bat, otter, and common seal, arctic tern, burrowing anemone, and many more. It is also the only known body of water in Ireland where northern sea fan occurs. Rivers flowing into it, including Roughty, Sheen, Slaheny, and Blackwater, have been known to be abundant in fish, in particular sea trout. A decline in fish numbers was observed in the mid 1990s, and local fishermen communities put the blame on sea lice infestations caused by the operation of salmon farms. Further objections against the establishment of new farms were raised in the early 2000s. Local residents have also been protesting against seaweed harvesting in the bay.

Approximately 2,000 ha (5,000 acres) stretching from Kenmare to Lamb's Head on the Iveragh Peninsula, and to Dursey Sound on the Beara Peninsula is now designated as a Special Area of Conservation (SAC) which are "prime wildlife conservation areas in the country, considered to be important on a European as well as Irish level", even though the proposal to designate was initially opposed.
