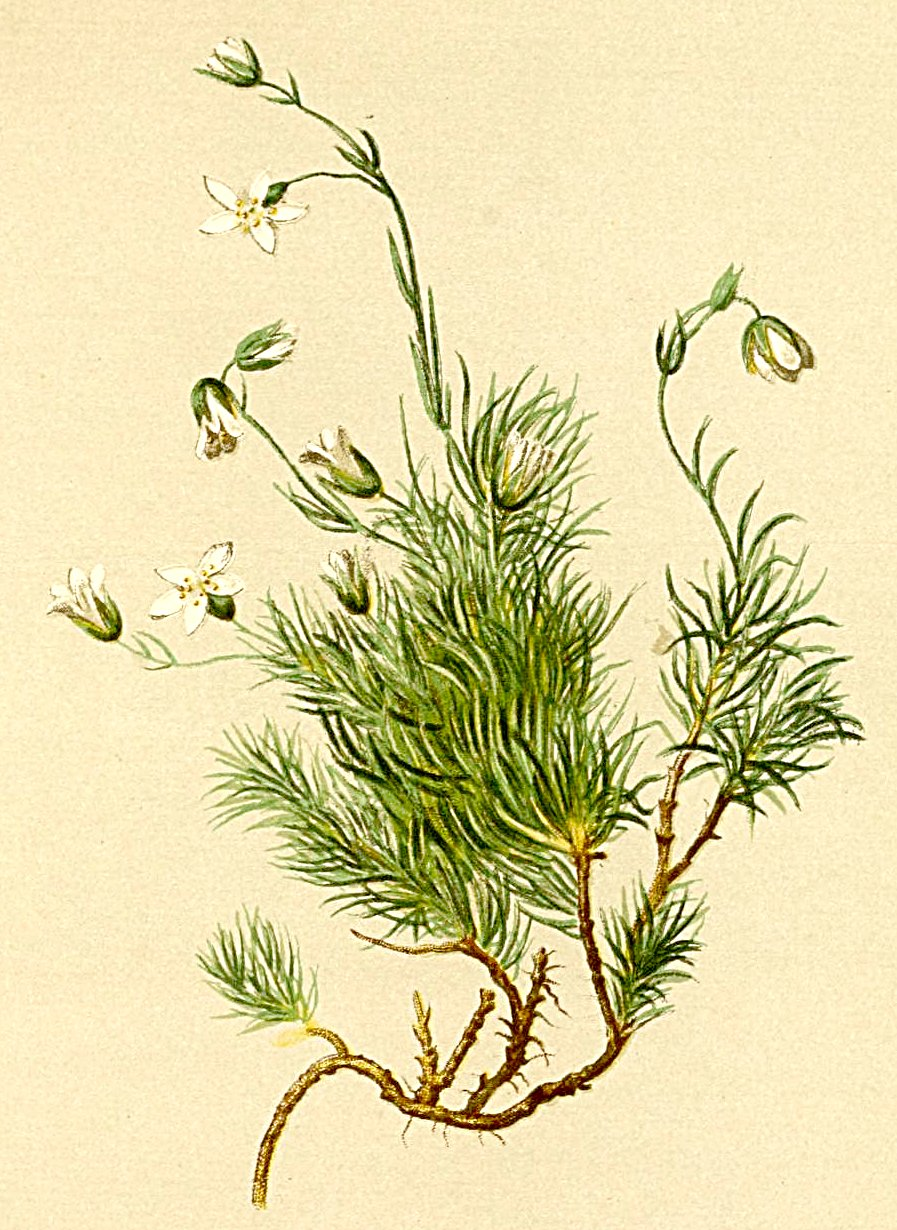
- In the Atlas der Alpenflora (1882)

Scientific classification
- Kingdom: Plantae
- Clade: Tracheophytes
- Clade: Angiosperms
- Clade: Eudicots
- Order: Caryophyllales
- Family: Caryophyllaceae
- Genus: Minuartia
- Species: M. recurva

Binomial name
- Minuartia recurva (All.) Schinz & Thell.

Synonyms
- Alsine recurva ((All.) Wahlenb.)

= Minuartia recurva =

Species of plant

Minuartia recurva, the recurved sandwort or sickle-leaved sandwort, is a rare tufted, calcifugous chamaephyte perennial flowering plant in the family Caryophyllaceae. It blooms from late spring to the end of summer.

== Description ==
This perennial, densely tufted, hairy plant has a woody base and flowering stems up to 15 cm (6 in) in length. The stems are wiry and lignified, with acicular leaves with three veins, curving to the side to a greater of lesser extent. The flowers are grouped in glandular flower-heads, the individual flowers being white and five-petaled. The inflorescence is a 1–8-flowered cyme. Sepals are 3 to 6 mm (0.12 to 0.24 in) long with 5–7 veins and are ovate-lanceolate; petals are 4 to 8 mm (0.16 to 0.31 in) long and ovate. The fruit is an ovoid capsule up to 5 mm (0.20 in) in length.

== Distribution ==
Minuartia recurva is found in mountainous regions of southern Europe and southwest Asia.

It is also found in Ireland's Caha Mountains, first noted there in 1964.

== Gallery ==
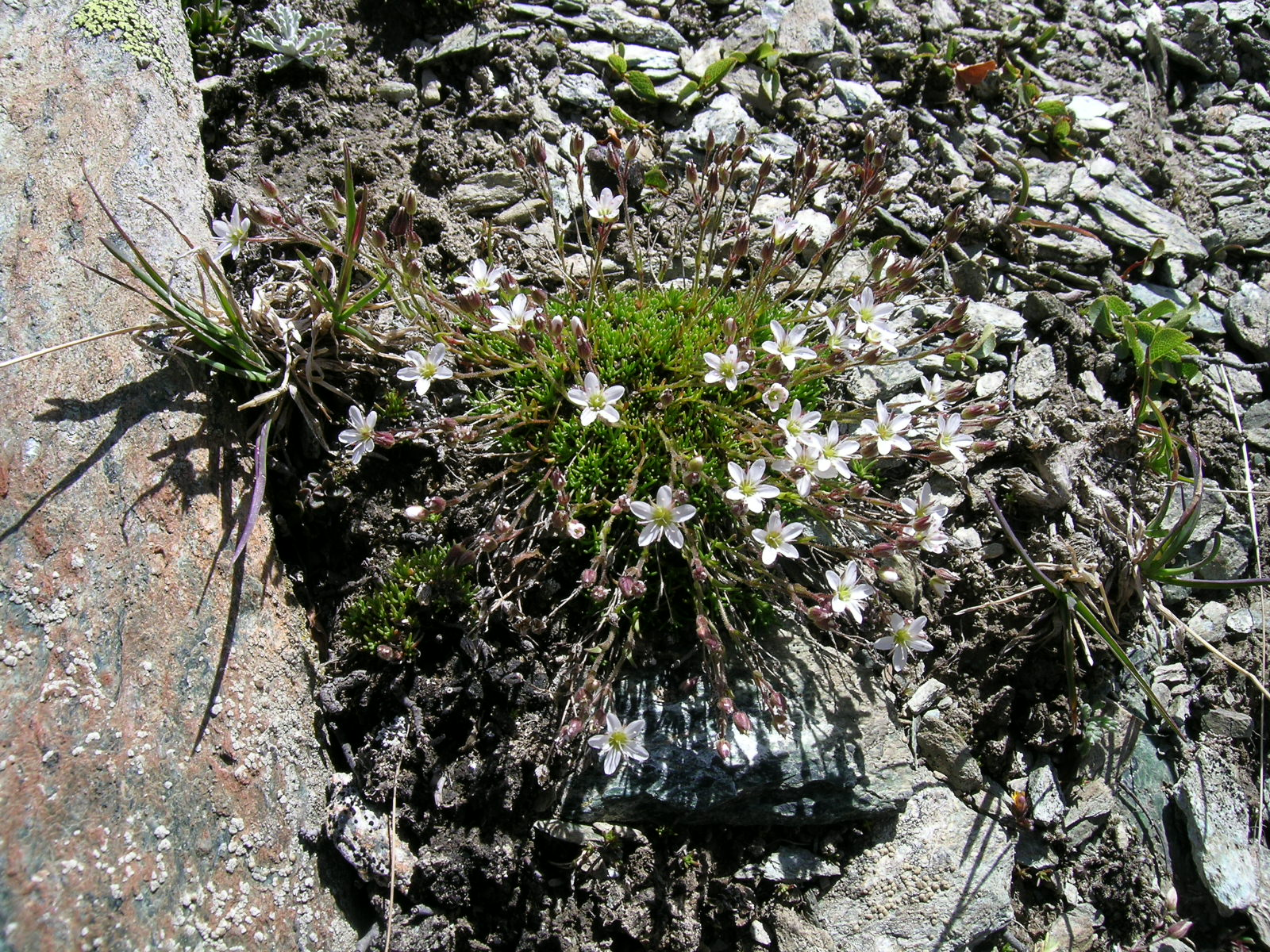
In the Canton of Valais

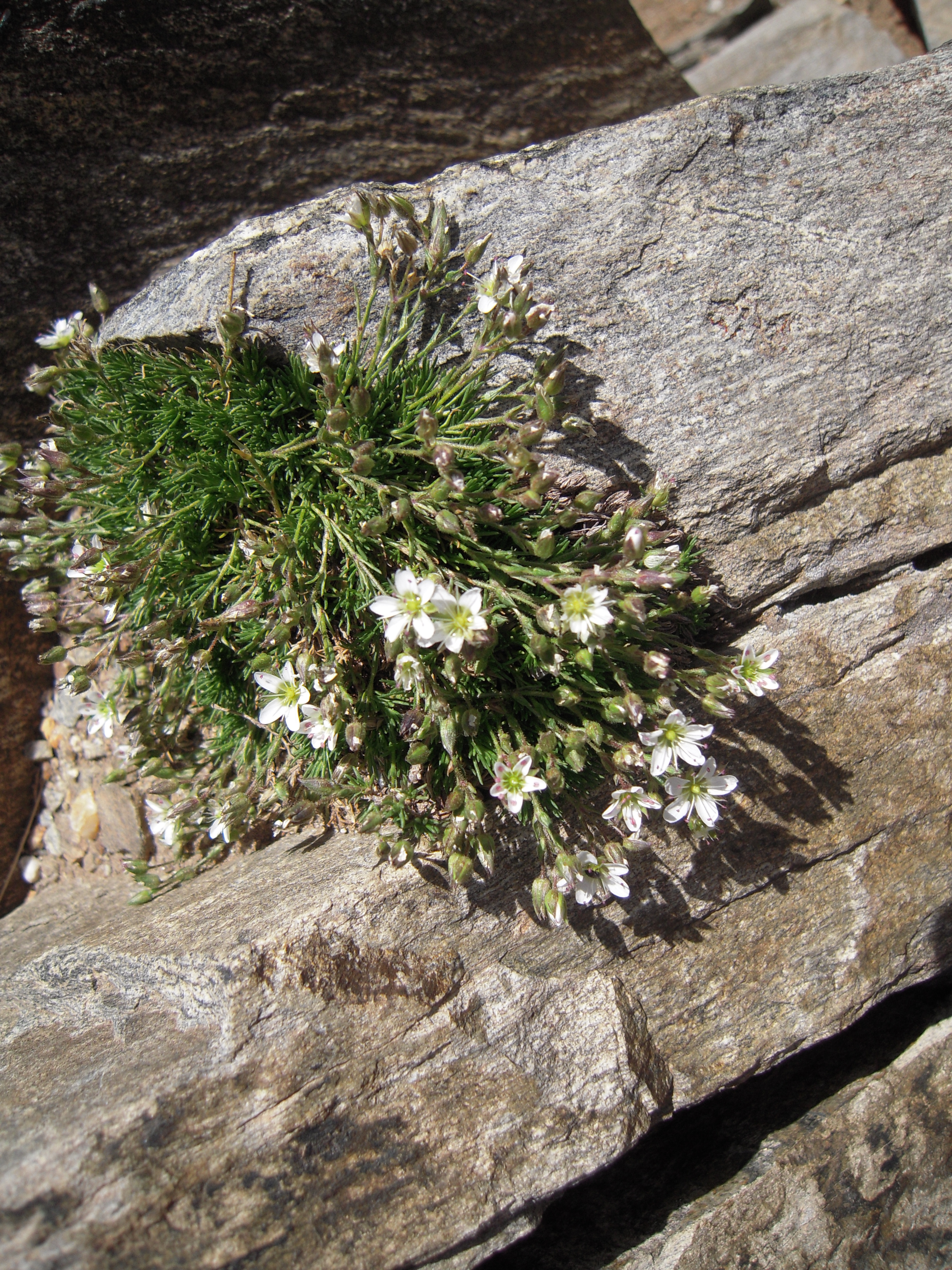
In the Pyrenees

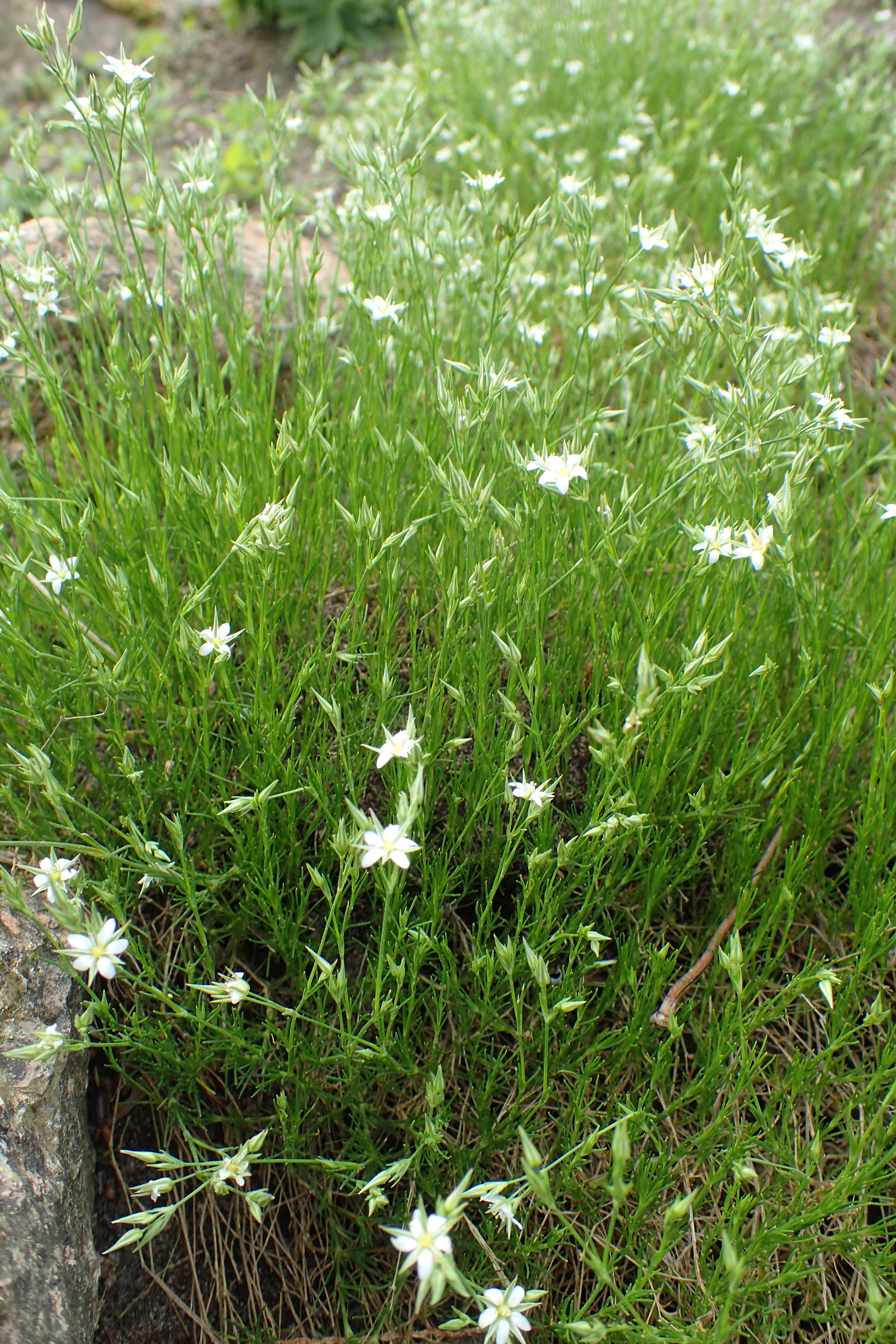
In Berlin-Dahlem Botanical Garden and Botanical Museum
