= Castletownbere =

Port town in County Cork, Ireland

Castletownbere Baile Chaisleáin Bhéarra
- Town
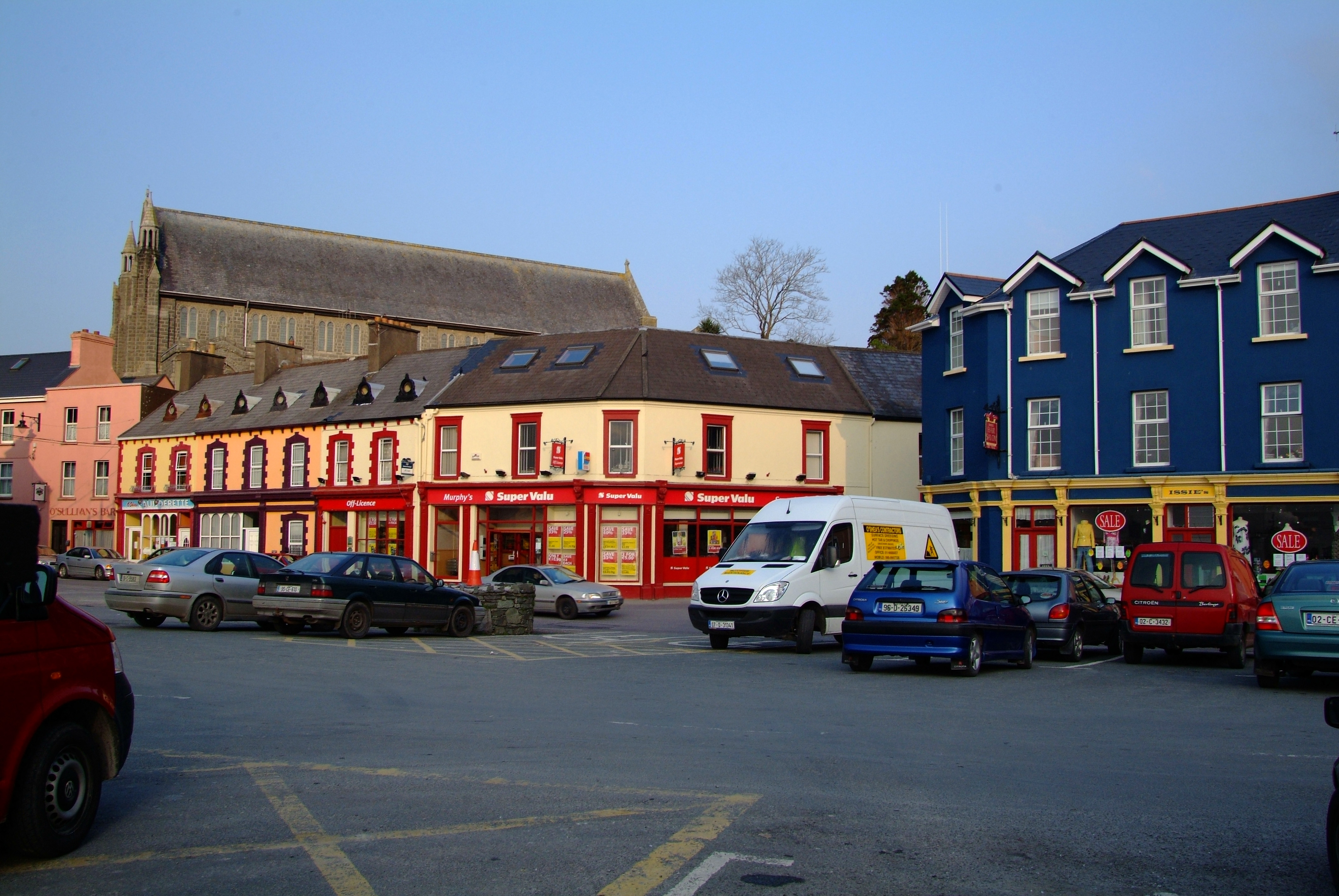
- The junction of Main Street, North Road and the pier in Castletownbere
- Interactive map of Castletownbere and environs
- Location in Ireland
- Coordinates: 51°39′07″N 9°54′32″W
- Country: Ireland
- Province: Munster
- County: County Cork
- Elevation: 16 m (52 ft)

Population (2022)
  - Total: 999
- Irish Grid Reference: V674458

Castletownbere (Irish: Baile Chaisleáin Bhéarra), or Castletown Berehaven, is a port town in County Cork, Ireland. It is on the Beara Peninsula by Berehaven Harbour.

A regionally important fishing port, the town also serves as a commercial and retail hub for the local hinterland. Located on the Wild Atlantic Way, tourism is also important to the local economy.

The area is the setting for Daphne du Maurier's 1943 novel Hungry Hill named after the nearby mountain of the same name.

== History and name ==
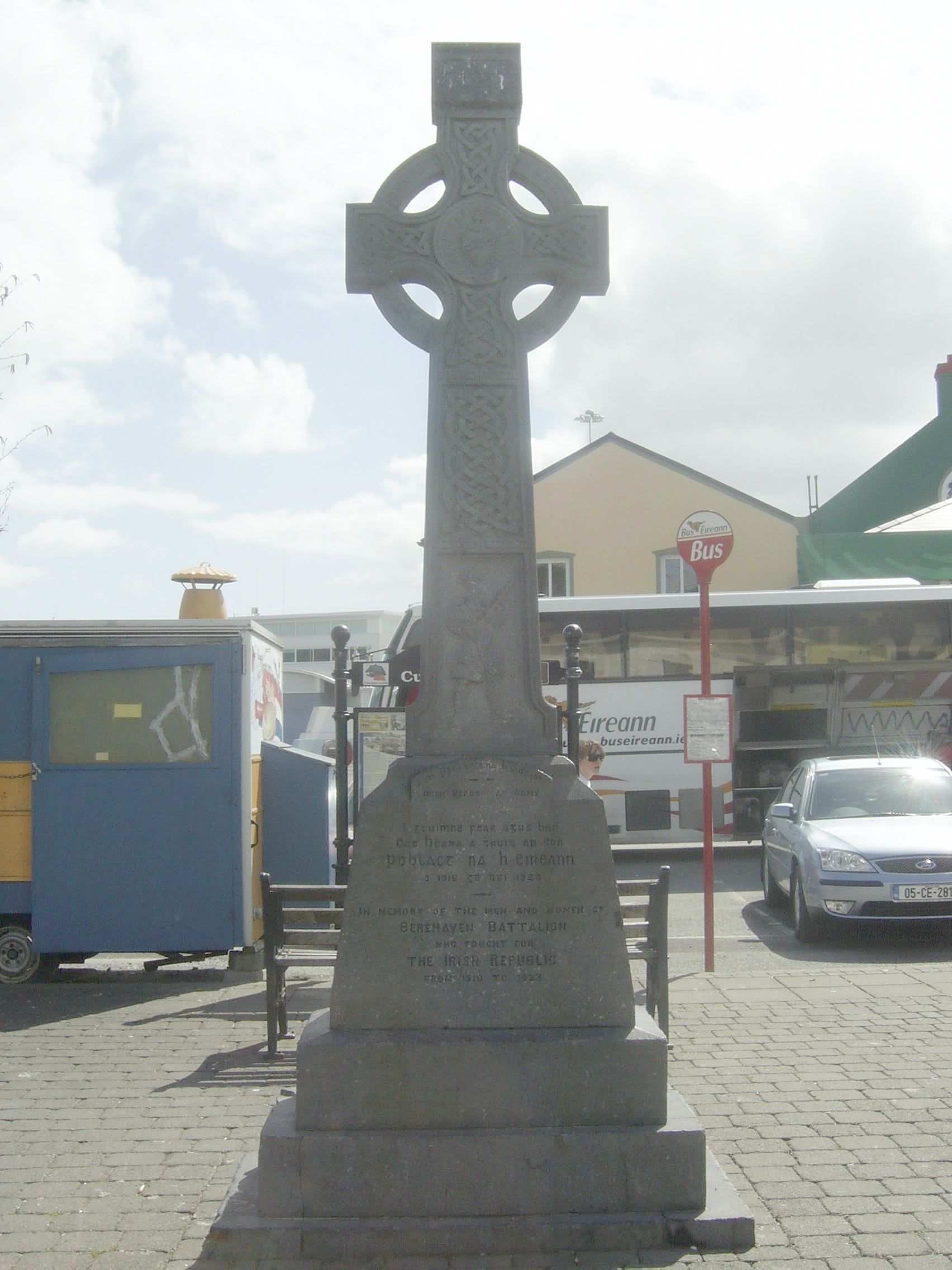
IRA memorial in the town's square: 'In Memory of the Men and Women of the Berehaven Battalion who fought for the Irish Republic from 1916 to 1923'

The Irish name of the town (Irish: Baile Chaisleáin Bhéarra, meaning 'the castle-town of Béarra') originally referred to a MacCarthy dynasty castle which once stood in the area. This should not be confused with Dunboy Castle – two miles west of the town – which was the seat of the O'Sullivan Beare family. Donal Cam O'Sullivan Beare, together with other Gaelic lords and with Spanish aid, rebelled against the English Crown. During the Siege of Dunboy the castle was reduced by the forces of Elizabeth I in 1602. He then retreated with his followers to Leitrim. O'Sullivan Beare's stance was commemorated in 2002, and there is a plaque in Irish and English on the castle ruins commemorating those who died there.

In 1796 Theobald Wolfe Tone and his confederates sailed into Berehaven Harbour in French men o' war. They anchored off Ahabeg – a townland five miles east of Castletownbere – but the gales were so violent that they could not land. Wolfe Tone fulminated that he was so close to Ireland that he could almost have spat onto the shore – he reflected, "England has not had such an escape since the Armada" – perhaps an allusion to the fact that adverse winds frustrated England's enemies on both occasions. For his efforts in preparing the local defences against the French, Richard White, a local landlord, was created Earl of Bantry and Viscount Berehaven in 1816.

In the 19th and early 20th centuries, Castletownbere and Berehaven Harbour were an important anchorage and naval port for the Royal Navy. In 1885, the harbour was a testing site for the development of the Torpedo ram when the warship HMS Polyphemus undertook a simulated attack on a fleet at anchor off the town.

The United States Navy established U.S. Naval Air Station Berehaven Ireland on 29 April 1918 to operate a Lighter-Than-Air (LTA) Kite balloon base during World War I. The base closed shortly after the First Armistice at Compiègne.

At Furious Pier, beside the golf course, on 14 May 1921 two soldiers were wounded and Privates Hunter, McCullen, Edwards and Chalmers – all of the King's Own Scottish Borderers – were shot dead by Irish Republican Army men led by Michael Og O'Sullivan. There was also an engagement between the IRA and Black and Tan members of the Royal Irish Constabulary just outside the town that day but no casualties were sustained.

Only one Castletownbere man was killed in the Irish Civil War; John O'Dwyer killed at Kealkill, County Cork in 1922 and commemorated on the plaque on Wolfe Tone Square in Bantry. The deep-water harbour was, up to the 19th century, much used by smugglers.

Castletownbere Lifeboat Station was opened by the Royal National Lifeboat Institution in 1997. Poorly-located temporary crew facilities were in use for many years but a new building and moorings were brought into use on 19 May 2013 which significantly reduced the time taken for the lifeboat to put to sea.

== Treaty port ==
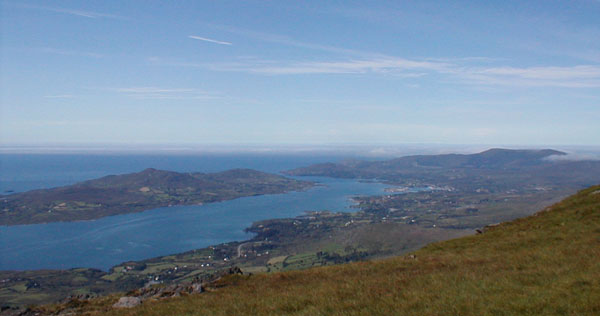
Berehaven Harbour

On 6 December 1921, the Anglo Irish Treaty was concluded. It provided for the establishment of the Irish Free State, which came into existence on 6 December 1922. The Treaty included provisions by which the British would retain sovereignty over three strategically important ports known as the Treaty ports, one of which being described in the Treaty as the "Dockyard Port at Berehaven".

Accordingly, even after the establishment of the Irish Free State, the Royal Navy continued to maintain its presence at the forts and batteries around Castletownbere and on Bere Island (together known as Berehaven). Berehaven remained under British sovereignty until 29 September 1938 when, pursuant to the Anglo-Irish Trade Agreement of 25 April 1938, the territory was ceded to Ireland. The Times reported the handover of port as follows:

LAST BRITISH TROOPS LEAVE EIRE – The last of the British troops stationed at the Southern Irish coast defences left last night for England. British troops under Major Clarke on Thursday officially handed over the fort at Berehaven, 100 miles [160 km] from Cork City, and yesterday they entrained at Bantry and arrived at Cork during the afternoon. After spending a few hours in the city, they embarked in the motor-vessel Innisfallen for Fishguard, being seen off by large crowds that gathered at the quayside.

The Times' choice of headline was misleading, as the British troops at Berehaven were not the last troops to leave the Irish state. The evacuation of Lough Swilly was yet to take place.

The golf course near the town was part of the Royal Naval base until 1938. The tennis court there used to be where huge oil tanks stood. The sentry boxes still exist at the entrance to the golf course and at a jetty on the golf course. A golf course existed to provide diversion for the sailors of the Royal Navy.

Berehaven is the second safest natural harbour in the world.

== Demographics ==
The town had a population of 860 in the 2016 census, with 1,483 in the surrounding electoral division, and approximately 4200 in the Beara Peninsula area as a whole.

Tourists add to this number during the summer season to a small degree. Since the 1960s a small number of immigrants to the area from the UK and continental Europe has increased the mix, and since the 2000s, some Poles and Lithuanians have lived in the area. As a fishing port, there is a mix of incoming and outgoing transients. A local Spanish influence is well established and a Spanish consulate building is situated in the town.

== Local economy ==
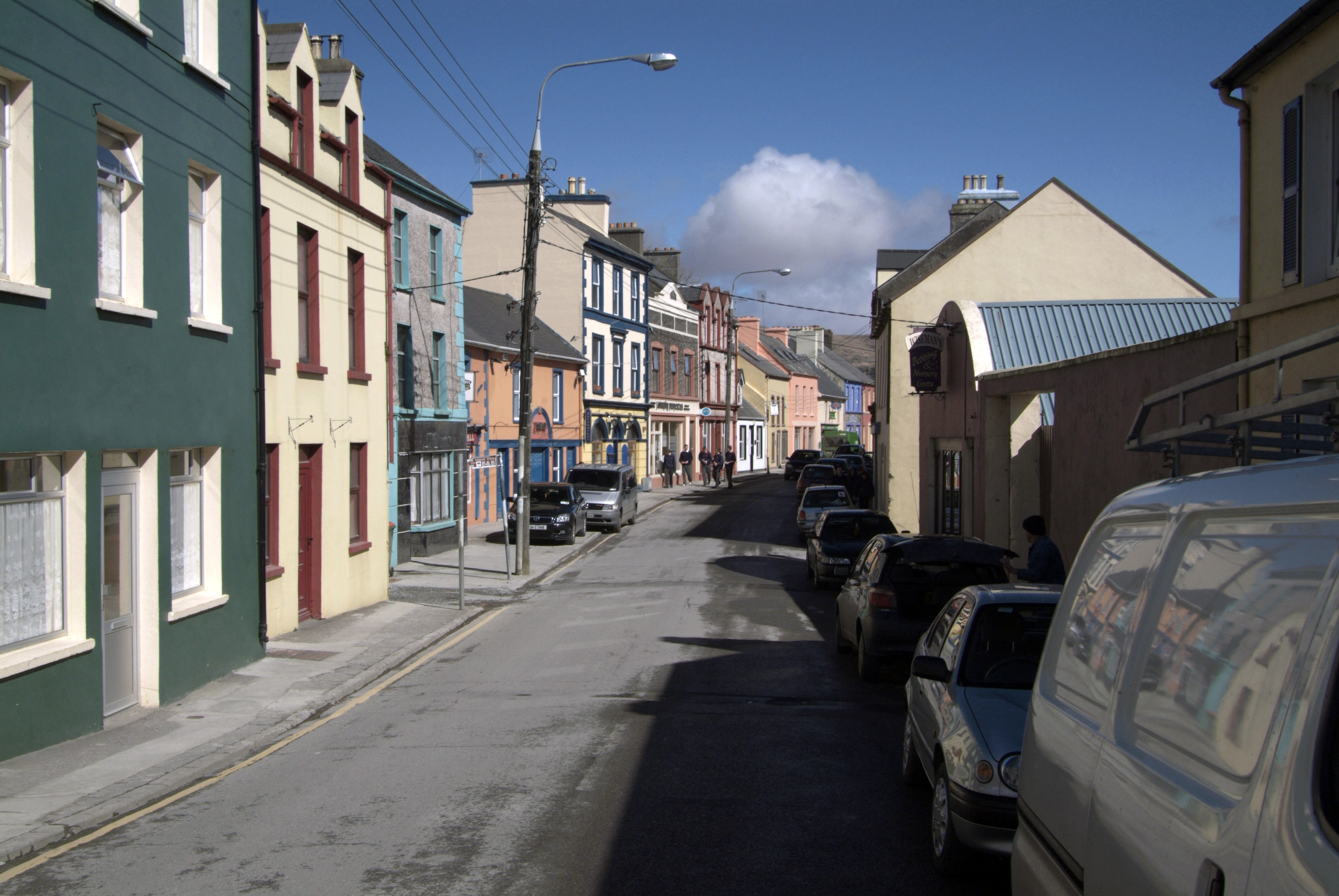
The Main Street of Castletownbere

Fishing is the chief economic activity in the town with, as of 2012, 80% of employment in the area associated with the industry. However, fishing only started up in a major way in the 1950s. Ships from the Soviet Union and the former Soviet Union came to Berehaven to purchase and process fish well into the 1990s. Castletownbere is currently one of the 5 main fishing ports on the island of Ireland. It is the largest fishing port in the country. It is also home to the Irish Fisheries training School, under the auspices of Bord Iascaigh Mhara (the Irish Fisheries Board).

== Places of interest ==
Three miles east of the town lies Waterfall House. It was the official residence of the Royal Naval commodore of the Western Approaches squadron, anchored in Berehaven. Waterfall House was bought in the late 1960s by the Marshall family from England who built and ran the Waterfall Holiday village which included the Wheel Inn bar. Unfortunately the owner was killed in a plane crash in the Welsh mountains while returning to Ireland in the early 1970s and the holiday village was never fully completed. It was run by his wife Silvia until 1977 when Waterfall House and the holiday village were bought by the Van Etten family – supermarket owners from North Holland in the 1970s. The Van Etten family briefly ran the now defunct Wheel Inn whilst residing in Waterfall House. Another Dutch couple, former owner of the elevator company Mohringer Mr. Fonkert in Haarlem has lived there since 1982. It was then bought by the girlfriend of filmmaker Neil Jordan.

Beside Waterfall House lies the Hermitage, built just after the Second World War. It was built on the site of a farmstead – Curryglass House, dating back to about 1800. Erskine Hamilton Childers, President of Ireland and son of Erskine Childers, stayed in the house periodically with the owners his friends, the Bridges-Adams family in the 1970s.

The nearby Puxley Mansion was burnt by the IRA in 1920.

== People ==
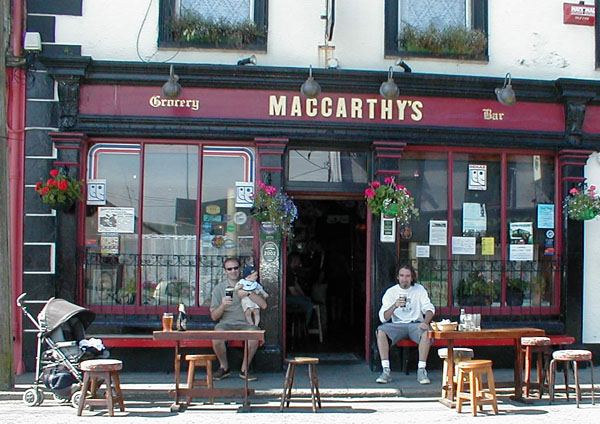
MacCarthy's Bar & Grocery

Notable people from the town include:

- Timothy Harrington (died 1910). Irish National League MP (Parnellite) and sometime Lord Mayor of Dublin. He is commemorated by a statue at the east end of the town.
- Standish James O'Grady (died 1928), the writer, was also born here where his father was the Church of Ireland clergyman. Castletownbere erected a shrine to O'Grady near his birthplace, the Glebe House.
- Dr Aidan MacCarthy (1914–1992) a prisoner of the Japanese during World War II and noted author of the book A Doctor's War. Both his daughters live in the town, one who used to run a restaurant and another who runs MacCarthy's Bar on the square (the latter featuring on the cover and in the title of the 1998 book by Pete McCarthy).

== Amenities ==
Local religious congregations and buildings include the Church of the Sacred Heart (Catholic) and St Peter's Church (Church of Ireland). The Church of the Sacred Heart was built in 1912 on the site of an earlier chapel. There was a full-time Anglican clergyman in the town until shortly after the Second World War. St Peter's Church is now owned by the local community development association. The association also contributed to improvements in the community playground.

== Sport ==
There is a nine-hole golf course two miles east of the town which was founded in 1989. A Gaelic Athletic Association pitch to the west of the town caters for traditional Gaelic Games and a rowing regatta is contested every August bank holiday weekend.

== In literature ==
In The Commodore by Patrick O'Brian, Jack Aubrey's squadron chases the French invading squadron to an unnamed place along the coast near here. The flagship is badly damaged in the fray, so Commodore Aubrey is pleased when two Royal Navy ships appear from Bere Haven, having heard the cannon fire. After tending all the wounded ashore, a local friend of Dr Maturin assumes he is there to see his wife, staying with a relative of her first husband, where the two have a joyous reunion, ending the novel on a high note. A local place name is given in the novel as Duniry, presumably a nod to Dunboy or Dursey.

The area is the setting for Daphne du Maurier's 1943 novel Hungry Hill named after the mountain here, the highest peak in the Caha Mountains. The novel was subsequently made into a film.

== See also ==
- Bantry Bay
- List of towns and villages in Ireland
