= Weymouth Lifeboat Station =

RNLI Lifeboat station in Dorset, England

- Flag of the RNLI

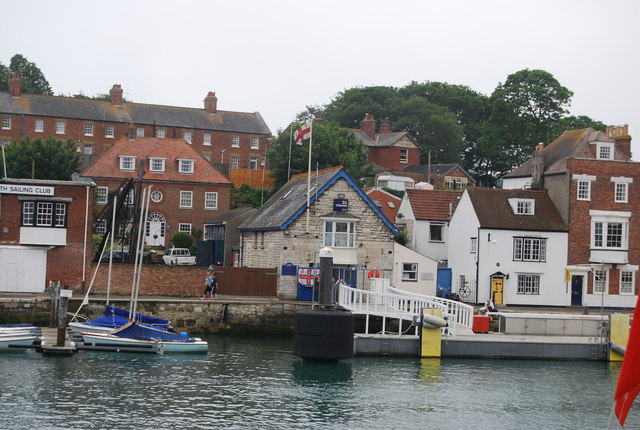
- Weymouth Lifeboat Station in 2013

- Location within Dorset

General information
- Type: Lifeboat station
- Location: Nothe Parade, Weymouth, Dorset, DT4 8TX, England
- Coordinates: 50.607306°N 2.450167°W
- Opened: 1869
- Owner: Royal National Lifeboat Institution

Website
- Weymouth RNLI Lifeboat Station

Weymouth Lifeboat Station can be found at Nothe Parade on the Nothe Peninsula, a landform on the south side of the mouth of the River Wey in Weymouth, a seaside resort approximately 7 miles (11 km) south of the county town of Dorchester, overlooking the Isle of Portland, and sitting mid-way between Lyme Regis and Swanage, on the Jurassic coast of Dorset, England.

A lifeboat station was established at Weymouth by the Royal National Lifeboat Institution (RNLI) in 1869.

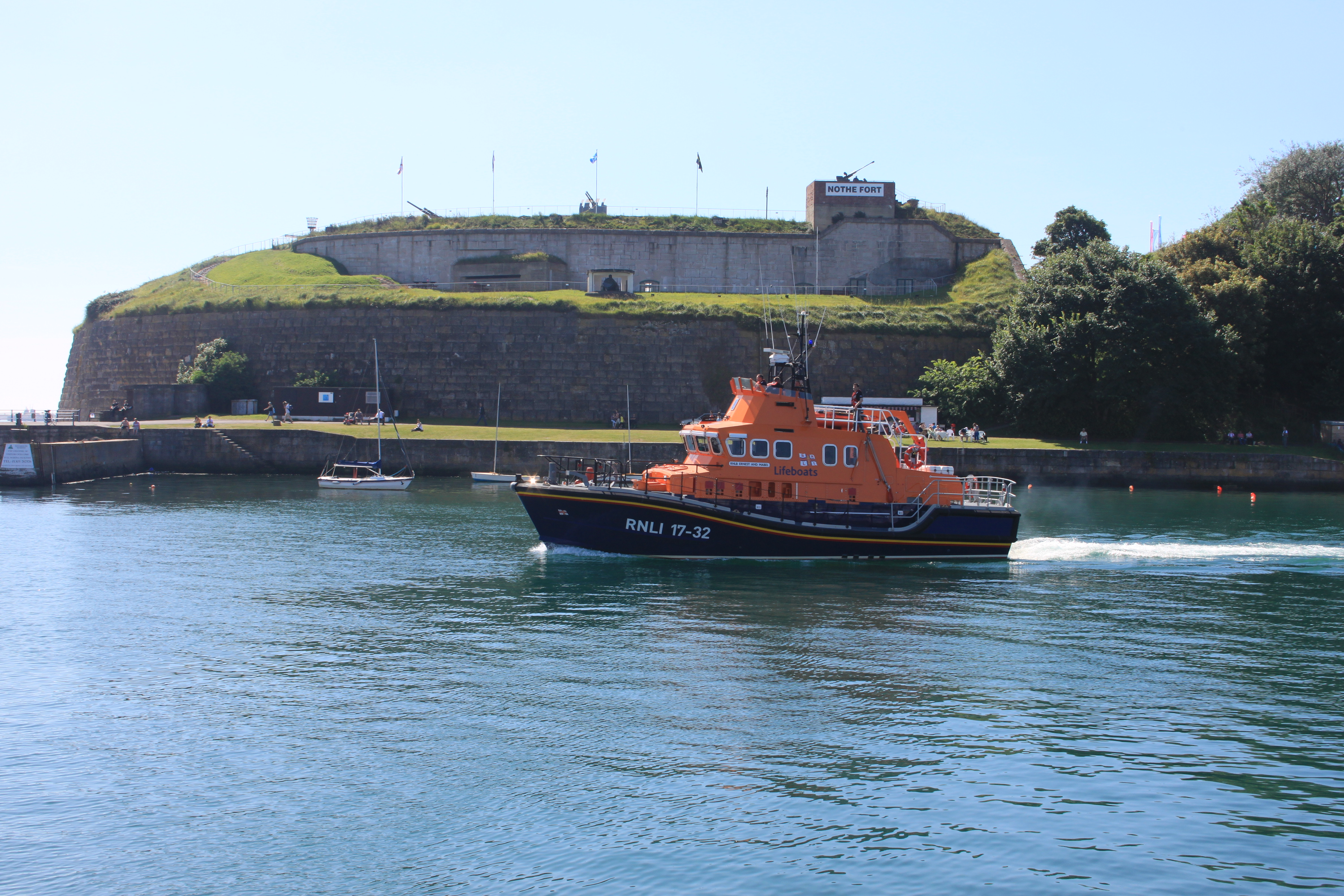
Severn-class All-weather lifeboat 17-32 Ernest and Mabel (ON 1261)

The station currently operates a Severn-class All-weather lifeboat (ALB), 17-32 Ernest and Mabel (ON 1261), on station since 2002, and a B-class (Atlantic 85) Inshore lifeboat (ILB), Jack & Phyl Cleare (B-917), on station since 2021.

== History ==
Ever since its founding in 1824, the Royal National Institution for the Preservation of Life from Shipwreck (RNIPLS), later to become the RNLI in 1854, would award medals for deeds of gallantry at sea, even if no lifeboats were involved. On 14 December 1825, the ship Vigilant was wrecked at Lulworth Cove, with the loss of the Master, two crewmen, and two boys. A group of coastguards, led by Boatman Owen Lloyd, managed to throw a line, and save the Mate, hauling him up a cliff. Lloyd was awarded the RNIPLS Silver Medal.

A lifeboat was placed at Portland by the Royal National Institution for the Preservation of Life from Shipwreck (RNIPLS) the following year, operated by the Dorset Shipwreck Association.

On 30 November 1841, the brig Amyntas, on passage from Quebec, was wrecked at West Bay. The Master and three crew drowned attempting to get ashore, but local man John Hansford rushed into the water, saving the lives of two other men. Hansford was awarded the RNIPLS Silver Medal.

By 1851, the Portland lifeboat had been condemned and was not replaced. It would be another 18 years, before another lifeboat would serve the area.

Further medals were awarded at Weymouth before the establishment of a lifeboat station. Capt. Pierre Picard, Master of the fishing smack Victoire Désirée was awarded the RNLI Silver Medal, when he and his crew rescued five people from the Dart of Lyme Regis on 8 March 1857. William Flann and Joseph White were each awarded the RNLI Silver Medal, when they, along with five other men, put off in a small boat at Chesil Beach on 30 December 1860, and saved the five crew of the schooner Norval of Plymouth.

A lifeboat station was finally established at Weymouth in 1869. Rather than being re-located at Portland, it was considered that Weymouth was better placed to aid vessels in distress on the north and east sides of Weymouth Bay. A boathouse was constructed on the west side of the harbour, costing £189, with a slipway costing a further £136.

A 33-foot-long (10 m) Peake-class self-righting 'Pulling and Sailing' (P&S) lifeboat was constructed by Forrestt of Limehouse, at a cost of £276, funded by the donation of £450 from The Earl of Strafford, arrived in Weymouth in January 1869.

On the 26 January, the latter part of the day being designated a general holiday, the lifeboat was drawn on its carriage by eight horses, in grand procession through the town to the Esplanade sands, followed by various civic dignitaries, Naval officers, men of the coastguard, and members of benevolent societies, accompanied by various bands of music. After a short service by the Rev. Talbot A. Greaves, the lifeboat was named Agnes Harriet, before being launched on demonstration to the assembled crowd.

== Motor Lifeboats ==
The boathouse was rebuilt in 1921, at a cost of £5000, to allow it to receive a motor lifeboat, although it would be three years before one was placed on station. At a ceremony on 10 September 1924, the 40-foot Watson-class motor lifeboat Samuel Oakes (ON 651) was launched, and the new boathouse was formally opened by Lady Ilchester. The boathouse had been funded via Hannam Edward Albany Ward, as noted by an inscribed table:

"This Life-boat House has been presented to the Royal National Lifeboat Institution through the generous initiative of Albany Ward, Esq., in bringing the claims of the Life-boat Service before the Patrons of the Albany Ward Theatres, Ltd., Jersey and Guernsey Amusements Company, Ltd., and Albany Ward's Theatres."

A new 40ft 6in Watson-class lifeboat, Lady Klysant (ON 721), gift of the Royal Mail and Union Castle steamship company, was placed at the station in 1929. It was one of a number of boats funded by the leading shipping companies, in response to an appeal by The Prince of Wales, subsequently Duke of Windsor. The lifeboat, with a single 50-hp Weyburn CE4 engine, was soon found to be under-powered for the location, and was replaced the following year with a 51-foot Barnett-class lifeboat, William and Clara Ryland (ON 735), powered by twin 60-hp Weyburn CE6 engines. Being too large for the boathouse, the lifeboat was kept at moorings in the harbour, an arrangement that continues to this day.

== 1990s onwards ==
Since 1995, the All-weather lifeboat has been supported by a B-class Inshore lifeboat (ILB). The B-class (Atlantic 21) Elizabeth Bestwick (B-541) arrived on station on 29 June 1995. The old Ferrymans Hut and Mast Store were demolished in 1996, for the construction of a new boathouse nearer the entrance of the harbour, to house the Inshore lifeboat. Works were also carried out on the 1921 boathouse, to provide better crew facilities.

The Severn-class All-weather lifeboat 17-32 Ernest and Mabel (ON 1261) was placed on service in 2002. The lifeboat, costing £1.8m, was funded primarily via the gift of Miss Beryl Taylor of Esher in Surrey, and was named in memory of her late parents. A bequest from Eileen Cressy, and a gift in memory of Chester Balch from his widow, provided additional funding. After naming the lifeboat, the 86-year-old Miss Taylor was taken on a trip around the harbour.

In 2003, access to the boat was made easier by the construction of a floating pontoon, at a cost of £130,000. Honorary Secretary Derek John Sargent was awarded the MBE in the Queen's New years Honours.

Major refurbishment work to improve the station building was scheduled to commence in May 2026. A two-storey extension has been carefully designed to respect the heritage of the building, whilst re-configuring the internal layout, improving all facilities, and upgrading the fabric of the building for greater efficiency.

== Description ==
The 1869 lifeboat station is still used for crew facilities. It is built from stone and faces the harbour. Above the boat doors is a bay window lookout. At the top of the gable is a date stone carved '1924' to commemorate when the building was modified for the arrival of its first motor lifeboat, the Samuel Oakes. Opposite the boathouse is a metal bridge leading to the floating pontoon where the ALB is moored. Much closer to the harbour entrance is the boathouse built in 1996. This is a long, low building that opens immediately onto a wide slipway, down which the ILB is pushed on its carriage to reach the water.

== Area of operation ==
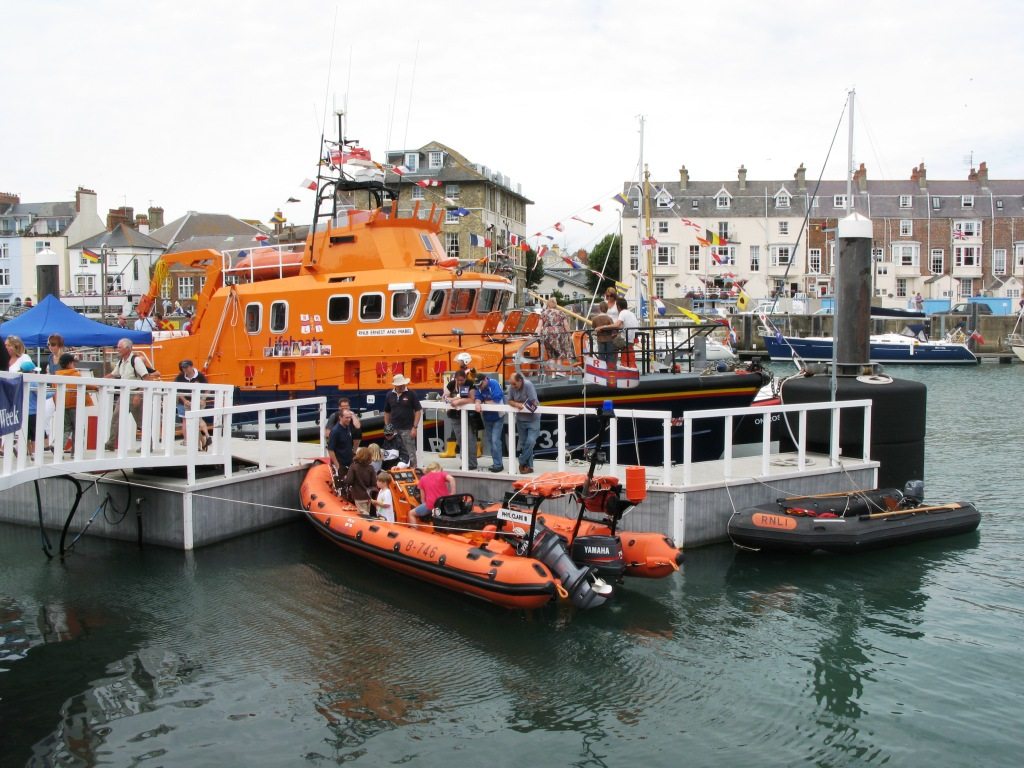
Phyl Clare III and the boarding boat, with Ernest and Mabel behind

The RNLI aims to reach any casualty up to 50 miles (80 km) from its stations, and within two hours in good weather. To do this the Severn-class lifeboat at Weymouth has an operating range of 250 nautical miles (460 km) and a top speed of 25 knots (46 km/h). Adjacent All-weather lifeboats are stationed at Swanage to the east, and Exmouth to the west. There is also an Inshore lifeboat at Lyme Regis, between Weymouth and Exmouth.

== Service awards ==
The volunteer crews of the RNLI do not expect reward or recognition for their work, but many rescues have been recognised by letters, certificates and medals from the RNLI management. The following are just some of the most notable.

In 1948, three people were rescued from the yacht Mite, during an operation that lasted eleven hours. For this service, Coxswain Frederick Palmer was awarded the RNLI Bronze medal. The following year he received the RNLI Silver medal, with Motor Mechanic James McDermott awarded a bronze medal, for their rescue of four people from a steam tug.

The rescue of five crew members from the yacht Dehra resulted in the award of a Bronze Medal to lifeboat man Donald Laker in 1965. Another bronze was awarded in 1972, to Coxswain Alfred Pavey, following the rescue of an injured crewman from the yacht Nomis.

On 14 October 1976, the lifeboat put to sea in a hurricane, to assist the yacht Latifa and her crew of eight. In charge of the rescue was Second Coxswain Victor Pitman. He did not have a full crew of trained lifeboat men and so two fishermen volunteered to make the crew up to strength. The lifeboat crew had an average age of 50. For the rescue on a day that none could remember worse conditions, Pitman was awarded the RNLI silver medal, with all the crew – both regular volunteers and the fishermen – accorded "The Thanks of the Institution inscribed on Vellum".

A Bronze Medal was awarded to Coxswain/Mechanic Derek Sargent, for leading the rescue of the crew of five from the catamaran Sunbeam Chaser during a storm off Portland Bill on 16 October 1987.

The following are awards made at Weymouth:

- RNIPLS Silver Medal
  Owen Lloyd, coastguard – 1825
  John Hansford – 1842
- RNLI Silver Medal
  Capt. Pierre Picard, Master of the fishing smack Victoire Désirée – 1857
  William Flann – 1861
  Joseph White – 1861
  Frank Perry – 1890
  Frederick Carter – 1890
  Frederick James Palmer, Coxswain – 1949
  Victor James Pitman, Second Coxswain – 1977
- RNLI Bronze Medal
  Frederick James Palmer, Coxswain – 1948
  James McDermott, Motor Mechanic – 1949
  Donald Laker, crew member – 1965
  Alfred Thomas Pavey, Coxswain – 1972
  Derek John Sargent, Coxswain/Mechanic – 1988
- The Thanks of the Institution inscribed on Vellum
  Frederick James Palmer, Coxswain – 1961
  The Coxswain and crew – 1965
  Dr E. J. Gordon Wallace – 1967
  Dr E. J. Gordon Wallace, Chairman and Honorary Medical Adviser – 1969
  Bertie Legge, Bowman – 1972
  Dr Jeremy Parkinson, the Honorary Medical Adviser – 1972
  Weymouth lifeboat crew – 1977
  Victor James Pitman, Second Coxswain – 1978
  Victor James Pitman, Coxswain – 1985
  Christopher William Tett, Second Coxswain – 1986
- A Framed Letter of Thanks signed by the Chairman of the Institution
  Coxswain and crew – 1967
  B. A. C. Legge, Bowman – 1968
  Coxswain Alfred Thomas Pavey and the other seven members of the lifeboat crew – 1969
- Letters of Appreciation
  E. A. Hall – 1965
  D. S. Southcombe – 1965
  Dr E. J. Gordon Wallace – 1965
- Member, Order of the British Empire (MBE)
  Derek John Sargent, Former Coxswain/Mechanic, Honorary Secretary – 2003NYH

== Roll of honour ==
In memory of those lost whilst serving at Weymouth:

- Washed into the sea and drowned whilst on shore duties, assisting the Weymouth lifeboat when on service to the US Tank Landing Craft 2425, in difficulties off Chesil Beach, 13 October 1944
  Cdr. J. R. Pennington Legh, DSC, RN (ret'd), H.M. Coastguard (55)
  Robert H. Treadwell, H.M. Coastguard (35)

== Isle of Portland lifeboat ==
=== Pulling and sailing lifeboats ===
On station	ON (Note: ON is the RNLI's Official Number of the boat.)	Name	Built	Class	Comments
1826–1851	Pre-116	Unnamed	1826	20-foot Plenty	(Note: 20 ft 0 in (6.10 m) x 6 ft 9 in (2.06 m) (6-oared) Plenty-class non-self-righting lifeboat, gift of the RNIPLS, built by William Plenty of Newbury, Berkshire, costing £100.); Condemned and sold in 1851.

== Weymouth lifeboats ==
=== Pulling and sailing lifeboats ===
On station	ON	Name	Built	Class	Comments
1869–1887	Pre-522	Agnes Harriet	1869	33-foot Peake Self-righting (P&S)	(Note: 33 ft 0 in (10.06 m) x 8 ft 6 in (2.59 m) (10-oared) Peake-class self-righting (P&S) lifeboat, gift of The Earl of Strafford, built by Forrestt of Limehouse, London, costing £276.); Sold in 1891.
1887–1903	141	Friern Watch	1887	34-foot Self-righting (P&S)	(Note: 34 ft 0 in (10.36 m) x 8 ft 0 in (2.44 m) (10-oared) self-righting (P&S) lifeboat, gift of Mr E. Homan of Finchley, built by Hansen of East Cowes, costing £347.); Broken up in November 1904.
1903–1924	513	Friern Watch	1903	38-foot Watson (P&S)	(Note: 38 ft 0 in (11.58 m) x 9 ft 4 in (2.84 m) (12-oared) Watson-class non-self-righting (P&S) lifeboat, gift of Mr E. Homan of Finchley, built by Thames Ironworks of Blackwall, London, costing £1,023.); Sold in 1925. Renamed Easting Down. Lost off Ijmuiden in 1965.

Pre ON numbers are unofficial numbers used by the Lifeboat Enthusiasts' Society to reference early lifeboats not included on the official RNLI list.

=== Motor lifeboats ===
On station	ON	Op. No. (Note: Op. No. is the RNLI's Operational Number of the boat carried on the hull.)	Name	Built	Class	Comments
1924–1929	651	—	Samuel Oakes	1918	40-foot Watson	Previously at Humber. Later transferred to Shoreham Harbour
1929–1930	721	—	Lady Kylsant	1929	40-foot 6in Watson	Transferred to Howth
1930–1957	735	—	William and Clara Ryland	1930	51-foot Barnett	Sold in 1958. Under restoration as a house boat following sinking at Hoo, August 2024.
1957–1976	939	—	Frank Spiller Locke	1957	52-foot Barnett (Mk. II)	Transferred to Galway Bay
1976–1999	1049	54-04	Tony Vandervell	1975	Arun	Sold in 1999 for further use as lifeboat MacElliott at Porkkala, Helsinki, Finland. Now a hydrographic survey boat at Kronstadt, St Petersburg, Russia, November 2025
1999	1160	52-46	Duke of Atholl	1990	Arun	Sold in 2007 for further use as a lifeboat in Iceland. Last reported being broken for spares, December 2025.
1999–2002	1073	52-18	Robert Edgar	1981	Arun	Sold 2003. Training boat 52-18 at Nelson, New Zealand, December 2024.
2002–	1261	17-32	Ernest and Mabel	2002	Severn	

More post-service details can be found on the respective lifeboat class pages.

=== Inshore lifeboats ===
==== B-class ====
On station	Op. No.	Name	Class	Comments
1995–1996	B-541	Elizabeth Bestwick	B-class (Atlantic 21)	
1996	B-544	Catherine Plumbley	B-class (Atlantic 21)	
1996–1997	B-543	Round Table	B-class (Atlantic 21)	
1997–1998	B-512	U.S. Navy League	B-class (Atlantic 21)	
1998	B-525	Spix's Macaw	B-class (Atlantic 21)	
1998–2015	B-746	Phyl Clare 3	B-class (Atlantic 75)	
2015–2021	B-774	Braemar	B-class (Atlantic 75)	
2021–	B-917	Jack & Phyl Cleare	B-class (Atlantic 85)	

== See also ==
- List of RNLI stations
- List of former RNLI stations
- Royal National Lifeboat Institution lifeboats
