= Waspik =

- Village
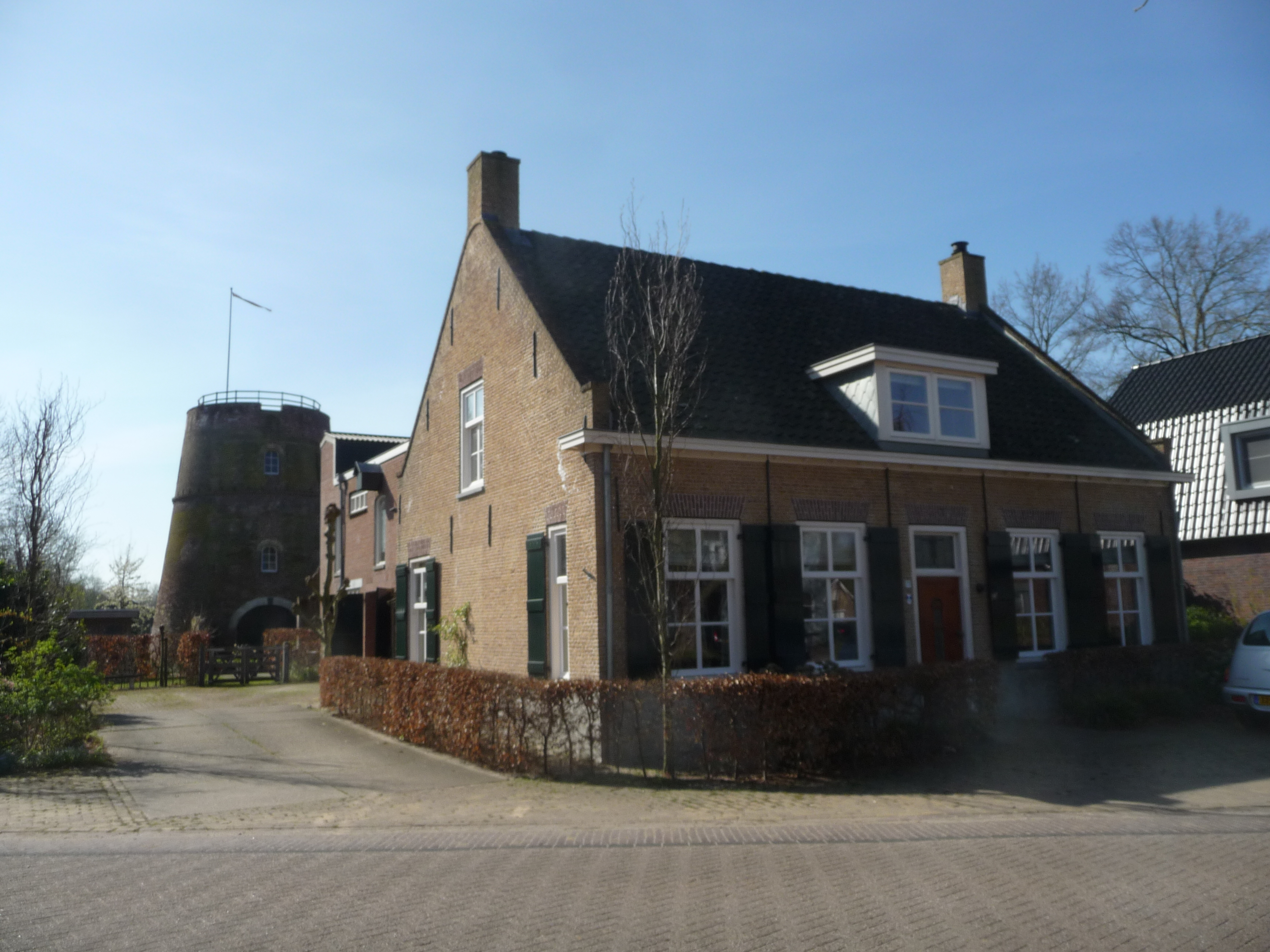
- Factory and remnants of a wind mill

- Flag Coat of arms

- Location in the province of North Brabant in the Netherlands Waspik (Netherlands)
- Coordinates: 51°41′12″N 4°56′40″E
- Country: Netherlands
- Province: North Brabant
- Municipality: Waalwijk

Area
  - Total: 18.61 km^{2} (7.19 sq mi)
- Elevation: 1.4 m (4.6 ft)

Population (2021)
  - Total: 5,155
  - Density: 277.0/km^{2} (717.4/sq mi)
- Time zone: UTC+1 (CET)
  - Summer (DST): UTC+2 (CEST)
- Postal code: 5165
- Dialing code: 0416

Waspik is a village in the Dutch province of North Brabant. It is located in the municipality of Waalwijk.

== History ==
Waspik was first mentioned in 1257 as Waspich, and means "headland in the mud". Waspik was established in the 12th century in a peat excavation area. It was severely damaged in the St. Elizabeth's flood of 1421 and the village started to concentrate more southwards.

The Dutch Reformed church dates from the 15th century, and never had a tower. The Catholic St Bartholomeus and Barbara Church was built in neoclassic style in 1840 and 1841. To the south of the village, a Carmelite monastery was built between 1926 and 1927 in Gothic Revival style.

Waspik was home to 1,667 people in 1840. Waspik was a separate municipality until 1997, when it became part of Waalwijk.

Waspik came to national attention in 2007 when a Liberian family was forced to flee the village after repeated racist attacks. An official report into events in the village concluded that everyone involved in the affair including the town council and housing corporations had failed to protect the family. 11 youths were initially charged with the attacks, though only 8 were found guilty and sentenced to community service in April 2008. After they moved from the village to Waalwijk, they were also forced to flee from this town.

== Gallery ==
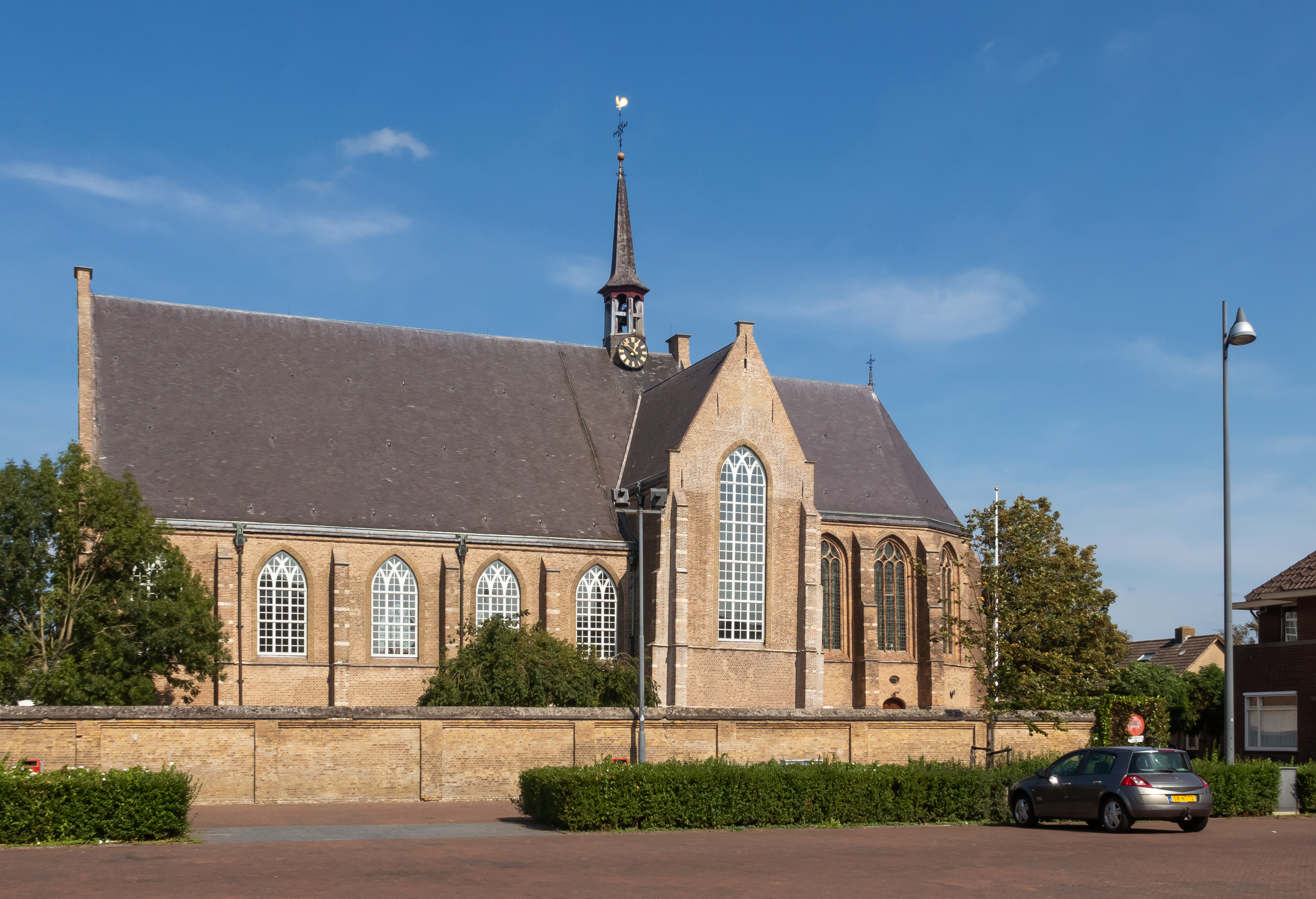
Waspik, reformed church

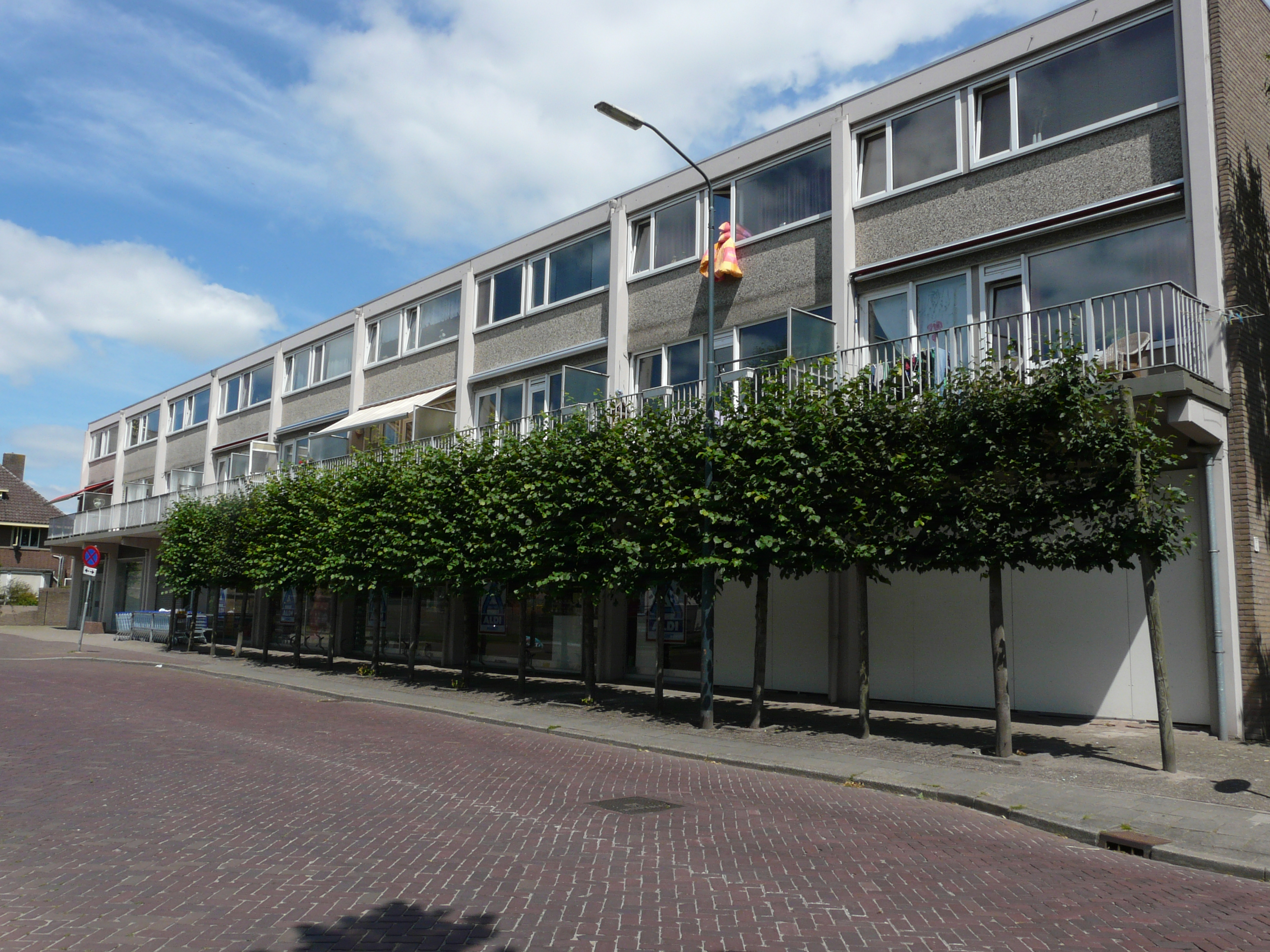
Apartment building

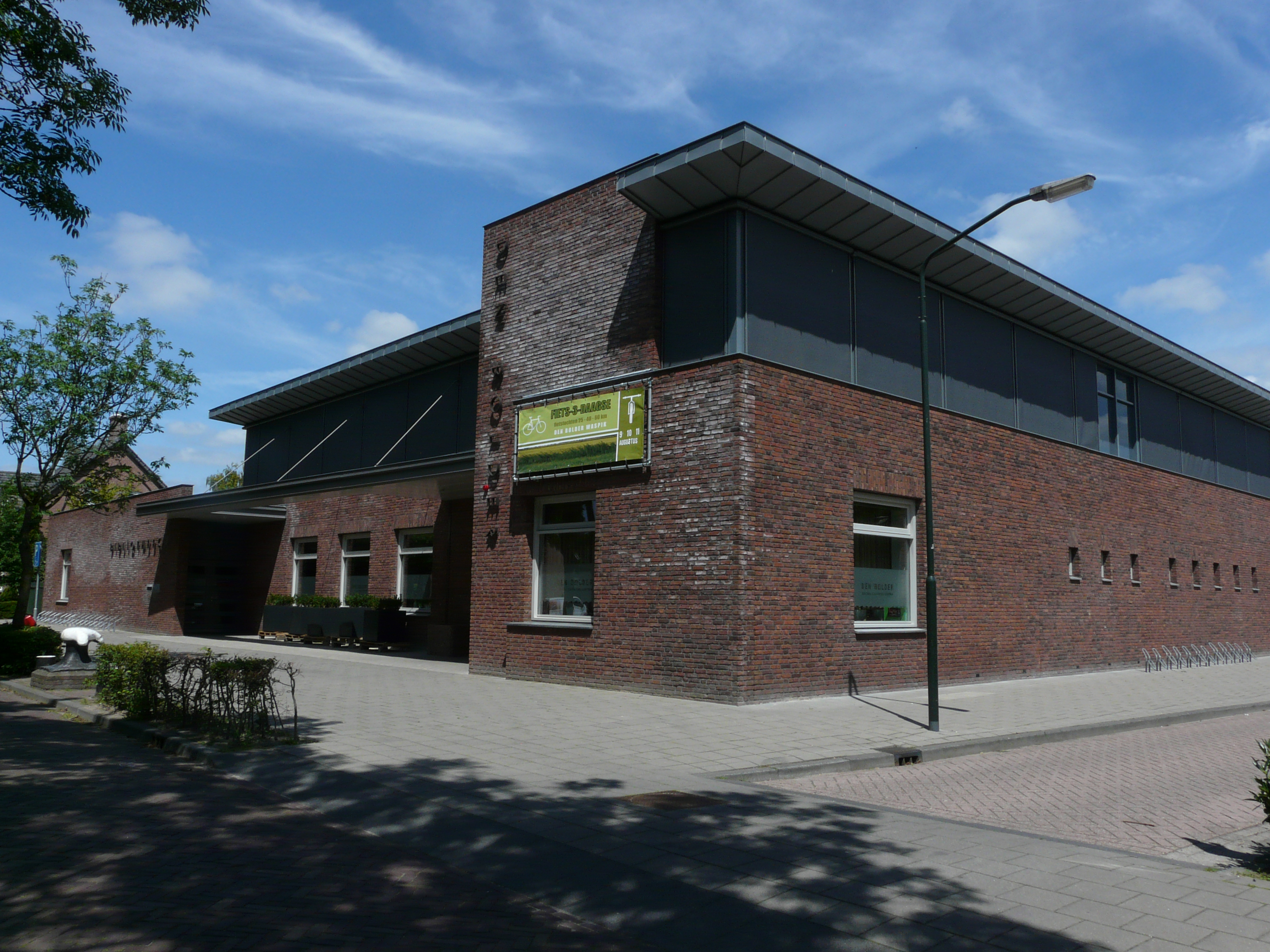
Cultural centre

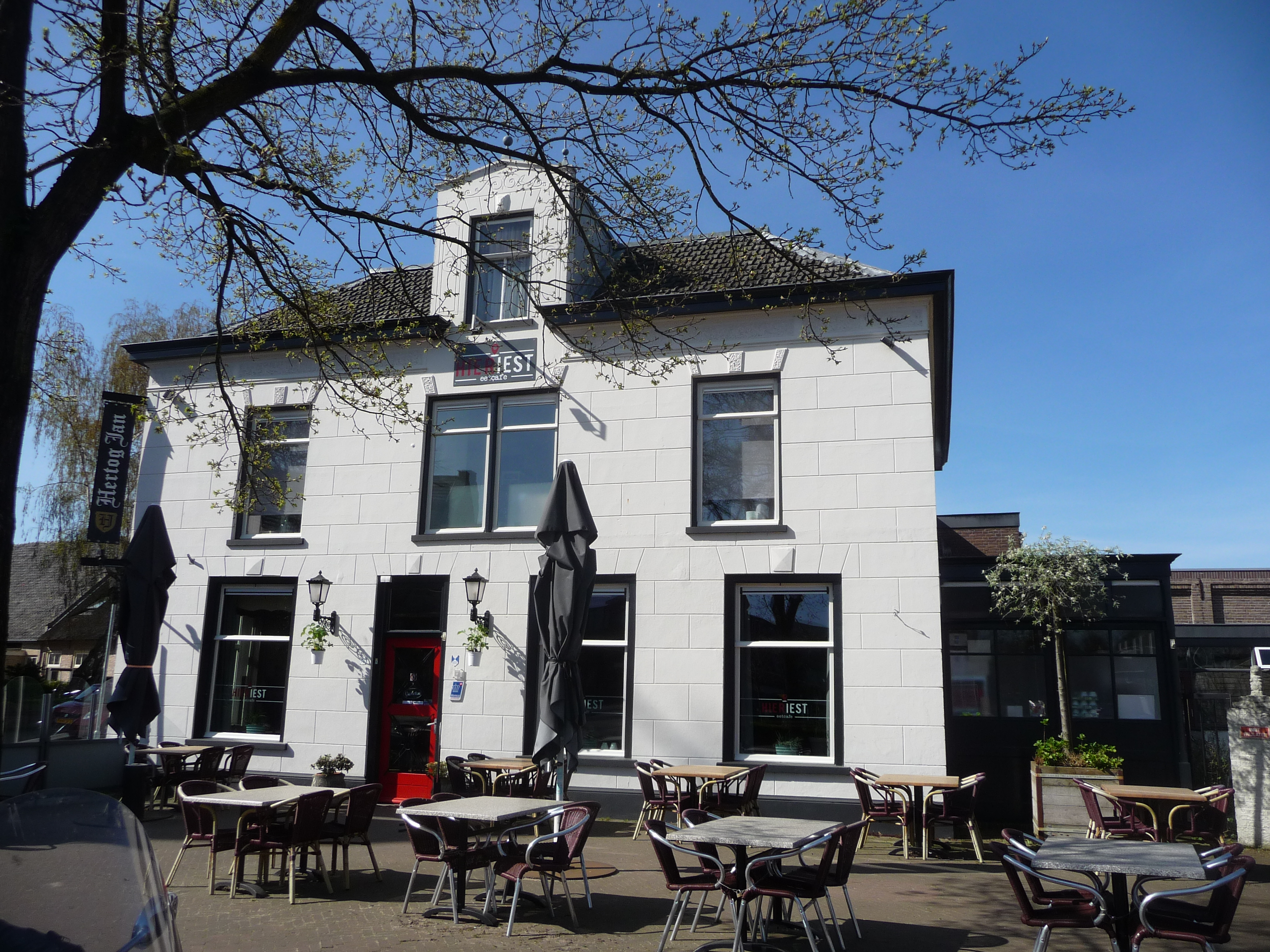
Pub in Waspik
