= Castletownbere Lifeboat Station =

RNLI Lifeboat station in County Cork, Ireland

- Flag of the RNLI

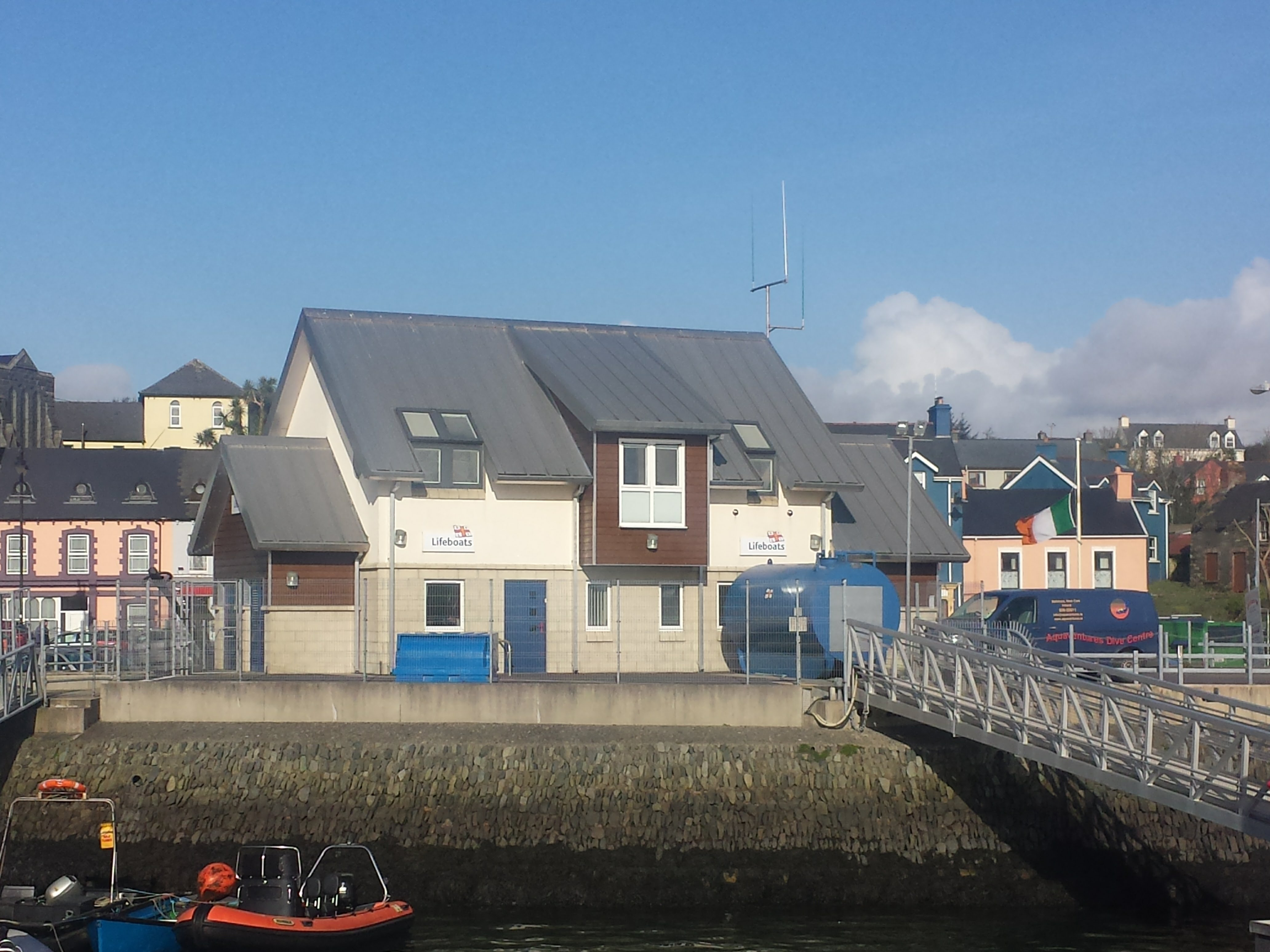
- Castletownbere Lifeboat Station in 2018

- Map of Ireland showing Castletownbere

General information
- Type: Lifeboat station
- Location: The Pier, Castletownbere, Co. Cork, P75 EC44, Ireland
- Coordinates: 51.652056°N 9.908361°W
- Opened: First lifeboat 1997; Current building 2013
- Cost: €950,000
- Owner: Royal National Lifeboat Institution

Website
- Castletownbere RNLI Lifeboat Station

Castletownbere Lifeboat Station can be found on the quay at Castletownbere (Castletown-Bearhaven), a town and fishing port in County Cork, located on the southern side of the Beara Peninsula overlooking Bere Island and Bantry Bay, on the south-west coast of Ireland.

A lifeboat station was first established at Castletownbere by the Royal National Lifeboat Institution (RNLI) in 1998.

Severn-class All-weather lifeboat 17-44 Annette Hutton (ON 1277)

The station currently operates 17-44 Annette Hutton (ON 1277), a Severn-class All-weather lifeboat, on station since 2004.

== History ==
The west coast of Ireland faces the Atlantic Ocean but had sparse coverage from lifeboats until late in the twentieth century. In 1990 there were only four stations, but by 2000, seven more had been established.

A public meeting was held at the Ford Ri Hotel in Castletownbere (latterly the Beara Coast Hotel) on 17 April 1997, where RNLI vice-president Air Vice-Marshal John Tetley, CB, CVO, RAF, explained that the RNLI were to establish an All-weather lifeboat station at Castletownbere in 1998, operating an Arun-class lifeboat for an evaluation period of 12-months.

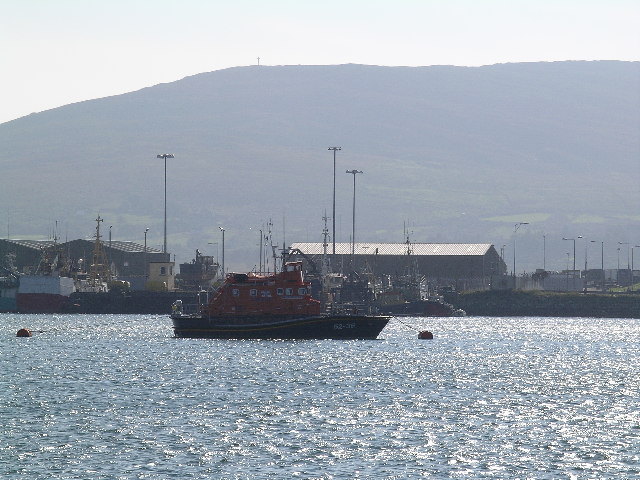
Arun-class lifeboat 52-36 Roy and Barbara Harding (ON 1118)

On 25 October 1998, the 52-foot Arun-class lifeboat, 52-36 Roy and Barbara Harding (ON 1118), previously on station at Galway Bay, arrived at Castletownbere, and was placed on a mooring. A temporary station consisting of a portakabin and containers, was set up on Dinish Island.

Roy and Barbara Harding (ON 1118) served at Castletownbere for seven years. In 2004, she was withdrawn to the relief fleet, and subsequently sold to the Icelandic lifeboat service. Before the arrival of the new Castletownbere lifeboat, the station had a brief period with a second Arun-class lifeboat, 52-42 Murray Lornie (ON 1144).

The new boat, a Severn-class All-weather lifeboat costing £1.9m, powered by twin 1250-hp Caterpilar 3412TA engines, delivering a top speed of 25 knots (46 km/h; 29 mph), and completed in 2004, was funded primarily from the legacy of Annette Amanda Marguerite Hutton, of Foxrock, County Dublin, and was named 17-44 Annette Hutton (ON 1277).

Crew training in Poole coincided with the official opening of the new RNLI College by H.M. The Queen on 28 July 2004. After seeing the Castletownbere crew in training, she was joined by H.R.H. Prince Philip and H.R.H The Duke of Kent, and then welcomed by the same crew, when the royal party were taken aboard Annette Hutton for a trip around Poole Harbour.

With training continuing on board, the lifeboat set out for the passage back to Castletownbere. During the voyage, a Mayday call was received off southern Ireland, with the lifeboat diverting to the casualty, but arriving on scene after the lifeboats from Baltimore and Castletownbere had recovered two people from the sea. She arrived at her new home on 2 August 2004, accompanied by a flotilla of 50 boats, and a large crowd of onlookers.

Castletownbere lifeboat moored at her floating pontoon, Sept 2026

After operating from the 'temporary' station for 15 years, new facilities were provided in 2013. A new two-storey station building was constructed on reclaimed land at the quayside, with an adjoining floating pontoon, which allowed the lifeboat to be moored alongside, rather than needing a boarding boat. The new station, costing €950,000 to construct, provided up-to-date crew facilities and a changing room, a souvenir shop, a training room and an operations office. Having the lifeboat moored alongside resulted in the launch time being halved. In the 15 years on service to that point, the Castletownbere lifeboat had been launched 223 times, rescued 288 people, and saved 30 lives.

The Annette Hutton was launched at 08:00 on Saturday 20 August 2016, under the command of Coxswain Brian O’Driscoll, after the Valentia coastguard requested assistance to a yacht in difficulties in Force 9 conditions, 45 miles (72 km) south of Mizen Head. The lone sailor set out from the Azores in early August, and after encountering problems, had been in regular radio contact with the coastguard, until his radio was washed overboard. He then activated his Emergency position-indicating radio beacon (EPIRB) to summon help to his position.

At 10:40, the yacht was located 50 miles (80 km) south-west of Castletownbere, and taken in tow, although at one point, the yachtman was brought aboard the lifeboat, after concerns about his well-being. The yacht was finally brought back to Castletownbere at 20:30, the lifeboat having been at sea for over 12 hours.

The lifeboat was launched on 10 October 2018, to the aid of the trawler Clodagh O, which had fouled her propellers and broken down. In a south-westerly Force 9 storm., the boat was being driven towards Piper Rocks at the entrance to the harbour. With just five crew aboard the lifeboat, the minimum number to launch, the Annette Hutton set out at 19:30, taking just three minutes to reach the trawler, which by now was just 20 m (66 ft) from the shore. With the tow rope ready to throw, it was caught by the fishermen at the first attempt, and the boat was towed to safety and into the harbour, the whole process taking an hour. For saving the crew of six, coxswain Dean Hegarty was awarded the RNLI Bronze Medal, the first Irishman to be recognised in this way in over 10 years. Medal Service Certificates were awarded to the crew.

== Area of operation ==
The RNLI aims to reach any vessel in distress up to 50 nmi (93 km) from the coast, within two hours of launching. The Severn-class All-weather lifeboat at Castletownbere has a range of 250 nmi (460 km; 290 mi) and a top speed of 25 knots (46 km/h; 29 mph). Adjacent lifeboats are stationed at Valentia to the north, and at Baltimore to the east.

== Station honours ==
The following are awards made at Castletownbere:

- RNLI Bronze Medal
  Dean Hegarty, Coxswain – 2019
- Medal Service Certificates
  Marney O’Donoghue, crew member – 2019
  Seamus Harrington, crew member – 2019
  John Paul Downey, crew member – 2019
  David Fenton, crew member – 2019
  Michael Martin-Sullivan – 2019
- Commendation awarded by the Director of Lifesaving Operations of the Institution
  Michael Martin-Sullivan – 2019
- 'A Framed Letter of Thanks signed by the Chairman of the Institution'
  Marney O’Donoghue, crew member – 2019
  Seamus Harrington, crew member – 2019
  John Paul Downey, crew member – 2019
  David Fenton, crew member – 2019

== Castletownbere lifeboats ==
On station	ON (Note: ON is the RNLI's Official Number of the boat.)	Op.No. (Note: Op.No. is the RNLI's Operational Number of the boat carried on the hull.)	Name	Built	Class	Comments
1998–2004	1118	52-36	Roy and Barbara Harding	1987	Arun	First stationed at Galway Bay. Sold in 2004 for further use as a lifeboat in Iceland.
2004	1144	52-42	Murray Lornie	1988	Arun	First stationed at Lochinver. Sold in 2005 for further use as a lifeboat in Iceland until 2023, when it was sold again for use as a workboat in Greenland.
2004–	1277	17-44	Annette Hutton	2004	Severn	

More post-service details can be found on the respective lifeboat class pages.

== See also ==
- List of RNLI stations
- List of former RNLI stations
- Royal National Lifeboat Institution lifeboats
