= Derreen Garden =

Garden in Ireland

Coordinates: 51°46′7.67″N 9°46′49.95″W

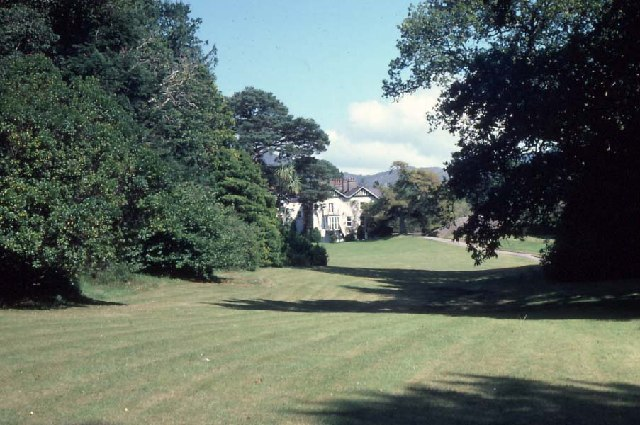
Derreen House and Garden

Derreen Garden lies on a promontory in Kilmakilloge Harbour on the Beara Peninsula, in Tuosist parish, near Kenmare in County Kerry, Ireland. The 4th Marquess of Lansdowne (1816–1866) initiated the planting of the garden in 1863, but it was his son and heir, The 5th Marquess of Lansdowne (1845–1927), who in his time served as Governor General of Canada, Viceroy of India, and British Secretary of State for Foreign Affairs, who from 1870 onwards gave the garden its present shape. Today it covers more than 60 acres and includes nearly 12 km of paths.

== History ==
Arms of the Marquesses of Lansdowne

The land around Derreen Garden was the seat of the Mac Finin Dubh Ó Súilleabháin family, a branch of the O'Sullivan Beare, from around 1320. After the Cromwellian conquest of Ireland (1649–1653), the property at Lauragh was confiscated and was granted in 1657 to Sir William Petty, physician of Oliver Cromwell, as reward for his services. The Mac Finin Dubh Ó Súilleabháin became one of the major tenants of Petty. The estate came into the ownership of the Fitzmaurice family when, in 1692, Petty's daughter Anne married Thomas Fitzmaurice, 1st Earl of Kerry, whose grandson, The 2nd Earl of Shelburne, became Prime Minister of Great Britain and, in 1784, was created Marquess of Lansdowne.

After the last male member of the Mac Finin Dubh Ó Súilleabháin dynasty had died in 1809, the tenancy of the estate passed to Peter McSwiney, who was married to a niece of that family. In 1856, McSwiney was evicted from Derreen by William Steuart Trench (1808–1872), the land agent of The 3rd Marquess of Lansdowne (1780–1863), for being some years in arrears in rent. From 1857 onwards, the house and its grounds were leased to different gentlemen. The last tenant was James Anthony Froude (1818–1894), an English historian, novelist, biographer, and editor of Fraser's Magazine, who leased Derreen between 1868 and 1871. In 1864, shortly after succeeding his father, The 4th Marquess of Lansdowne (1816–1866) spent some days at Derreen House with his wife. Being taken in by the beauty of the property, he decided to live there for part of the year. However, this never came to fruition, as in July 1866 he suddenly died of a stroke at his London club.

When The 5th Marquess of Lansdowne (1845–1927) inherited the property in 1866, he was, like his father, drawn to the remoteness of the place. In 1870, he personally supervised alterations to Derreen House, and from 1871 onwards the new Marquess and his young wife, Lady Maud Evelyn Hamilton (1850–1932), a daughter of The 1st Duke of Abercorn, began to use Derreen as their summer residence. In the same year, Lord Lansdowne embarked on an ambitious plan to transform the bare rock and scrub oak around the house into a luxuriant woodland garden. It is said that he employed 40 people to create the garden. 400 acres of land were planted to shelter a collection of shrubs and specimen trees, many of them brought back from the Marquess's sojourns as Governor General of Canada and Viceroy of India. In addition, he subscribed to the Himalayan plant-hunting expeditions and bought exotic plants from the well known nursery firm of Veitch. In 1903, King Edward VII and Queen Alexandra visited Derreen House and Garden and planted two commemorative bamboos.

With the exception of the years between 1883 and 1894, when he was successively Governor General of Canada and Viceroy of India, and those of the Irish War of Independence (1919–1921) and the Irish Civil War (1922–1923), The 5th Marquess of Lansdowne continued to visit Derreen for three months of each year until his death in 1927, which occurred while he was travelling to Derreen. During the Second World War, Derreen was separated from the Lansdowne title by the death of Captain The 7th Marquess of Lansdowne (1917–1944), who was killed in action in August 1944, when his titles and entailed estates were inherited by a kinsman. Derreen, not being entailed, was inherited by his sister, Lady Katherine Evelyn Constance Petty-Fitzmaurice (1912–1995), and is now owned and managed by her grandson, Charlie Bigham.

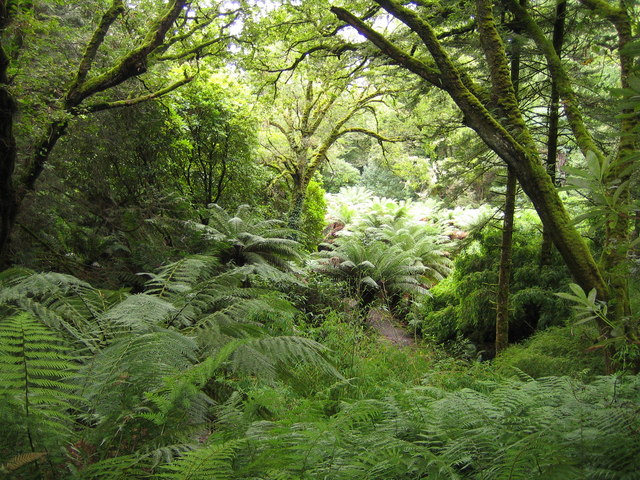
Woodland in Derreen Garden

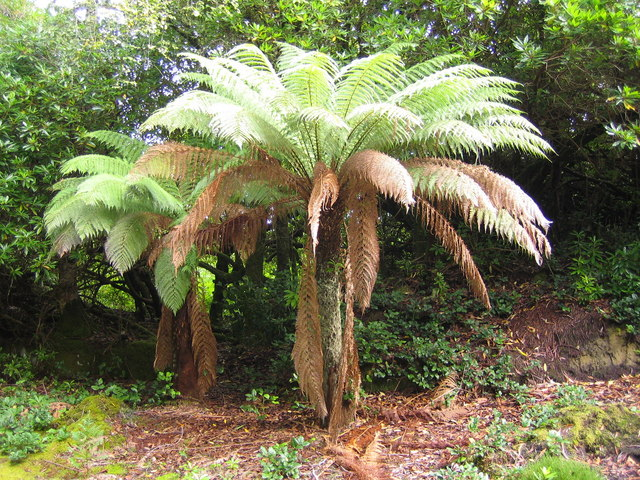
Two tree ferns (Dicksonia antarctica)

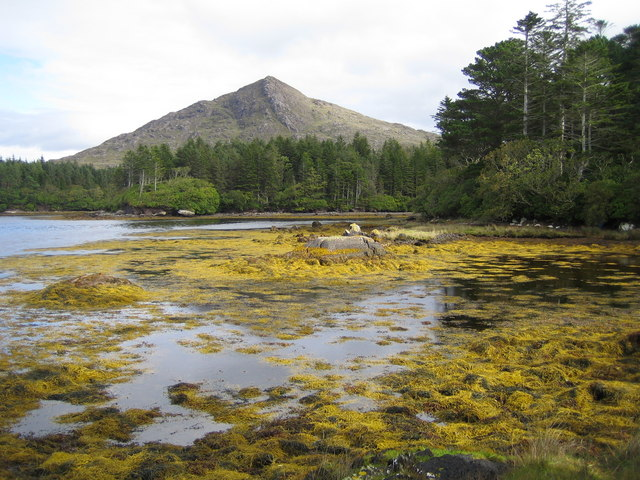
View along the coastline at the north-western side of Derreen Garden, with Mount Knockatee in the background

== The garden ==
The well known garden extends over the greater part of the peninsula on which it lies. It covers an area of 60 acres and includes nearly 12 km of paths, which wind through mature and varied woodland. In the moist and mild climate, tender and exotic plants flourish. Many of the paths in the garden provide marvellous glimpses of the sea (Bay of Kilmakilloge) and the distant mountains (Caha Mountains, MacGillycuddy's Reeks).

Derreen garden is particularly noted for its rhododendrons (Rhododendron arboreum) and tree ferns (Dicksonia antarctica). Throughout the garden a rich patina of moss, lichens ferns and saxifrages gives a sub-tropical feel to the whole area. As a foil to the luxuriant plantings, there are great natural outcrops of rocks. The garden is open to the public every day all year round.

== The house ==
Derreen Garden is designed around Derreen House, which was originally built by the Mac Finin Dubh Ó Súilleabháin family, a branch of the O'Sullivan Beare, in the first half of the eighteenth century. After the last male member of the Mac Finin Dubh Ó Súilleabháin dynasty had died in 1809, the house passed to Peter McSwiney who was married to a niece of that family. He was evicted from Derreen House in 1856 by William Stewart Trench, the agent of The 4th Marquess of Lansdowne (1816–1866), for being some years in arrears of rent.

The house was enlarged between 1863 and 1866, when The 4th Marquess of Lansdowne built a new wing. Between 1870 and 1873, it was further enlarged by The 5th Marquess of Lansdowne (1845–1927) at a cost of £2,500. James Franklin Fuller was appointed as architect.

The house was plundered and burned in 1922 during the Irish Civil War (1922–1923), but rebuilt in a similar style by The 5th Marquess of Lansdowne in 1924. Some financial help came from the Irish Free State. Derreen House underwent further reconstruction between 1925 and 1926, having been attacked by dry rot. It is not open to the public.

== See also ==
- Marquess of Lansdowne
- Henry Petty-Fitzmaurice, 4th Marquess of Lansdowne (1816–1866)
- Henry Charles Keith Petty-FitzMaurice, 5th Marquess of Lansdowne (1845–1927)
- Charles Petty-Fitzmaurice, 7th Marquess of Lansdowne (1917–1944)
