= Sugarloaf (County Cork) =

Mountain in Ireland

Coordinates: 51°44′N 9°38′W

Sugarloaf Mountain
- Gabhal Mhór
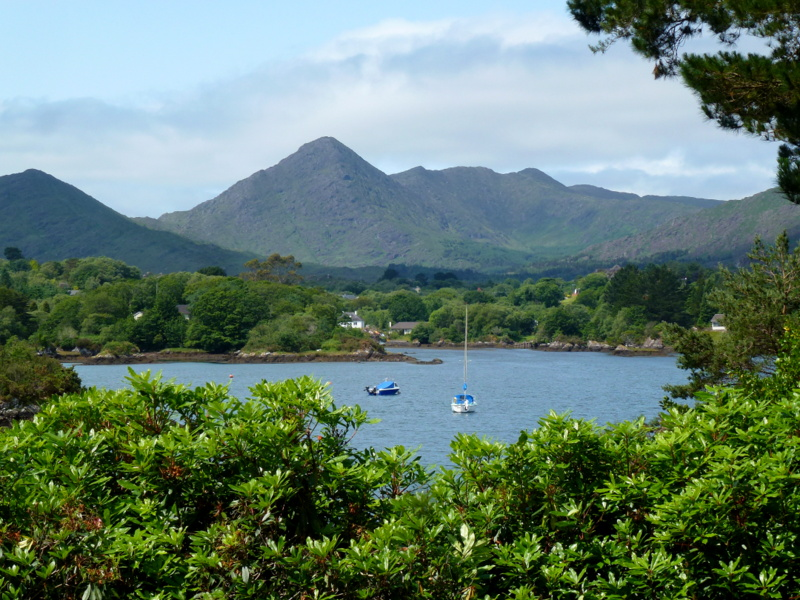
- Sugarloaf from Ilnacullin

Highest point
- Elevation: 574 m (1,883 ft)
- Prominence: 126 m (413 ft)

Naming
- English translation: big fork
- Language of name: Irish

Geography
- Location within island of Ireland
- Location: County Cork, Ireland
- Parent range: Caha Mountains

Sugarloaf Mountain (Irish: Gabhal Mhór) is one of the Caha Mountains, southwest of Glengarriff in County Cork, Ireland. It is a pointed mountain with a height of 574 metres (1,883 ft).

The English name refers to the mountain's likeness to a sugarloaf. The Irish name Gabhal Mhór means "big fork", with the lower neighbouring peak called Gabhal Bheag, "little fork", or Gowlbeg Mountain. These names seem to have developed from Sliabh na Gaibhle, "mountain of the fork", likely referring to a confluence of streams. The anglicised form Slieve Gowl is found in several 19th-century sources.
