= Hungry Hill =

Mountain in County Cork, Ireland

Hungry Hill / Knockday
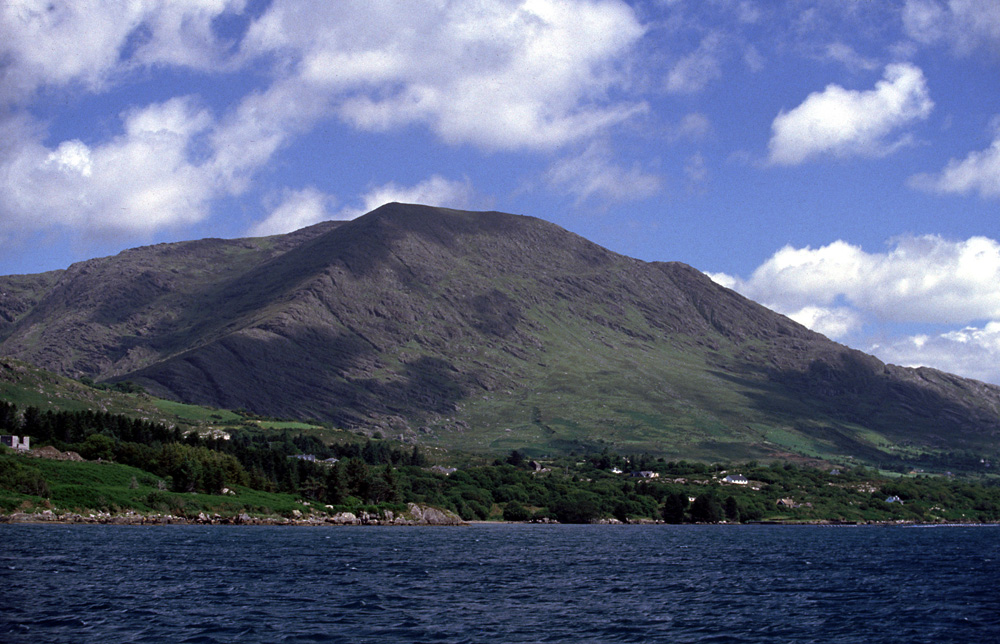

Highest point
- Elevation: 685 m (2,247 ft)
- Prominence: 400 m (1,300 ft)
- Listing: Marilyn, Hewitt
- Coordinates: 51°41′9″N 9°47′31″W

Naming
- Native name: Cnoc Daod

Geography
- Location within Ireland
- Location: Beara Peninsula, Ireland
- Parent range: Caha Mountains
- OSI/OSNI grid: V761497

Hungry Hill or Knockday (Irish: Cnoc Daod) is the highest of the Caha Mountains on the Beara Peninsula in Munster, Ireland.

== Etymology ==
The first part of the Irish name Cnoc Daod means 'hill'. The second part may be a dialectal variant of déad, meaning 'tooth', 'set of teeth' or 'jaw'. It has been anglicised as Knockdhead and Knockday.

== Geography ==
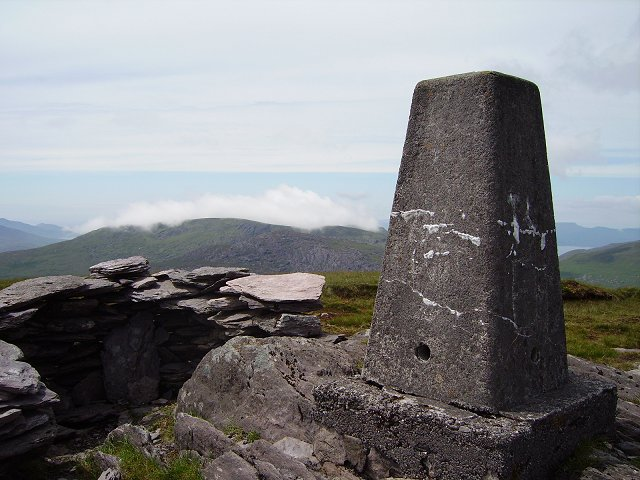
The summit

With a height of 685 metres (2,247 ft) it is the highest peak of the Caha Mountains and the 130th highest in Ireland. Hungry Hill lies on the border of counties Cork and Kerry, although the peak is on the Cork side.

There is a cairn at the summit and a number of standing stones to the south and east of the mountain. At its eastern foot are two lakes — Coomadayallig and Coomarkane — which both drain into the Mare's Tail waterfall. This is the highest waterfall in Ireland and the UK.

== In popular culture ==
Hungry Hill is the title and setting of a 1943 novel by English author Daphne du Maurier. Her descriptions of the mountain and environs are markedly similar to the actual location. In the novel, the name of the mountain is metaphoric, as during the course of the novel the mountain seems to "swallow" successive generations of the Broderick family, who own and mine the mountain. The story is reputedly based on the Irish ancestors of Daphne du Maurier's friend Christopher Puxley.

The character Daniel O'Rourke, from the Irish folktale of the same name, lives at the bottom of Hungry Hill.

== See also ==
- List of mountains in Ireland
