= Lauragh =

Village in County Kerry, Ireland

Coordinates: 51.7628°N 9.7792°W

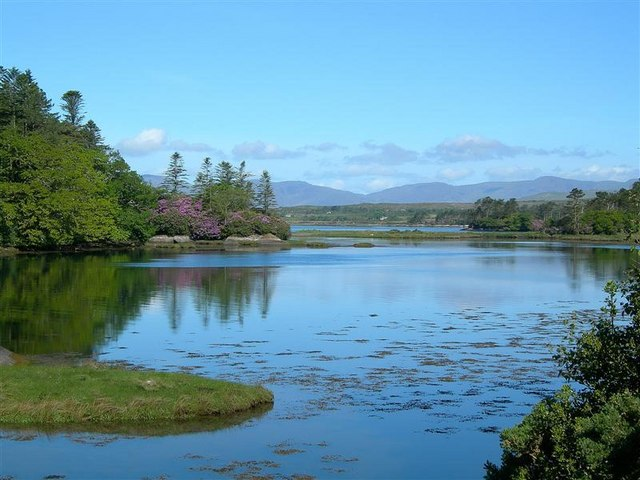
Lauragh Bay

Lauragh (Irish: An Láithreach) is a village on the Beara Peninsula, County Kerry, Ireland. The townlands of Lauragh Upper and Lauragh Lower contain several ringfort and souterrain sites. There is a stone circle and stone row site, in Cashelkeelty townland, near Lauragh.

Lauragh's former post office, now a pub, was built c. 1870. As of 2017, the modern post office operated alongside a café and bike hire business.

The area's national (primary) school, Lauragh National School, was built in 1862. As of 2024, there were 13 children enrolled at the small school.

The local Catholic church, St. Killian's church in Lauragh, is in Tuosist parish in the Roman Catholic Diocese of Kerry.

== See also ==
- Derreen Garden
