= Caha Mountains =

Low mountains in County Cork, Ireland

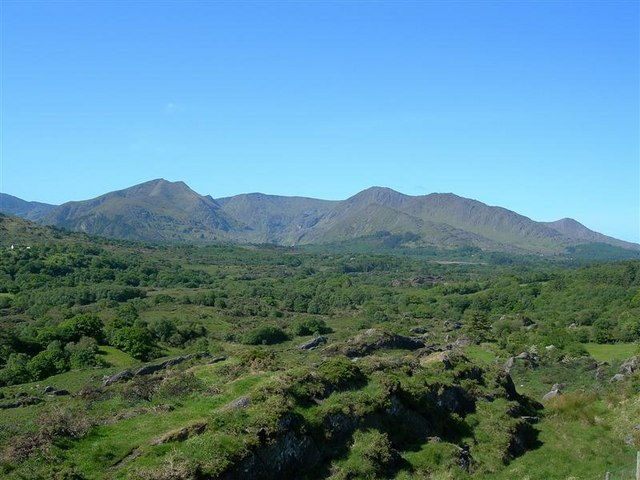

Highest point
- Peak: Hungry Hill
- Elevation: 685 m (2,247 ft)
- Coordinates: 51°45′N 9°43′W

Naming
- Etymology: Old Irish cechar, "bog"
- Native name: An Cheacha (Irish)

Geography
- Location within Ireland
- Country: Ireland
- Provinces of Ireland: Munster

The Caha Mountains (An Cheacha in Irish) are a range of low sandstone mountains on the Beara peninsula in south-west County Cork, Ireland. The highest peak is Hungry Hill, at 685 m (2,247 ft). Other notable peaks include Knocknagree, Sugarloaf Mountain, Eskatarriff, Knocknaveacal, Derryclancy, Nareera, Killane Mountain and Baurearagh Mountain.

== Mountains ==
The Caha Mountains have been listed as a Special Area of Conservation. The underlying rock is Old Red Sandstone and the terrain generally consists of rocky crags and outcrops interspersed with grassy slopes. The southern part of the range has a broad ridge with a boggy plateau dotted with small lakes, and there are substantial cliffs in the northwestern part. Other habitat types include blanket bog, wet and dry heathland, scree slopes and species-rich grassland.

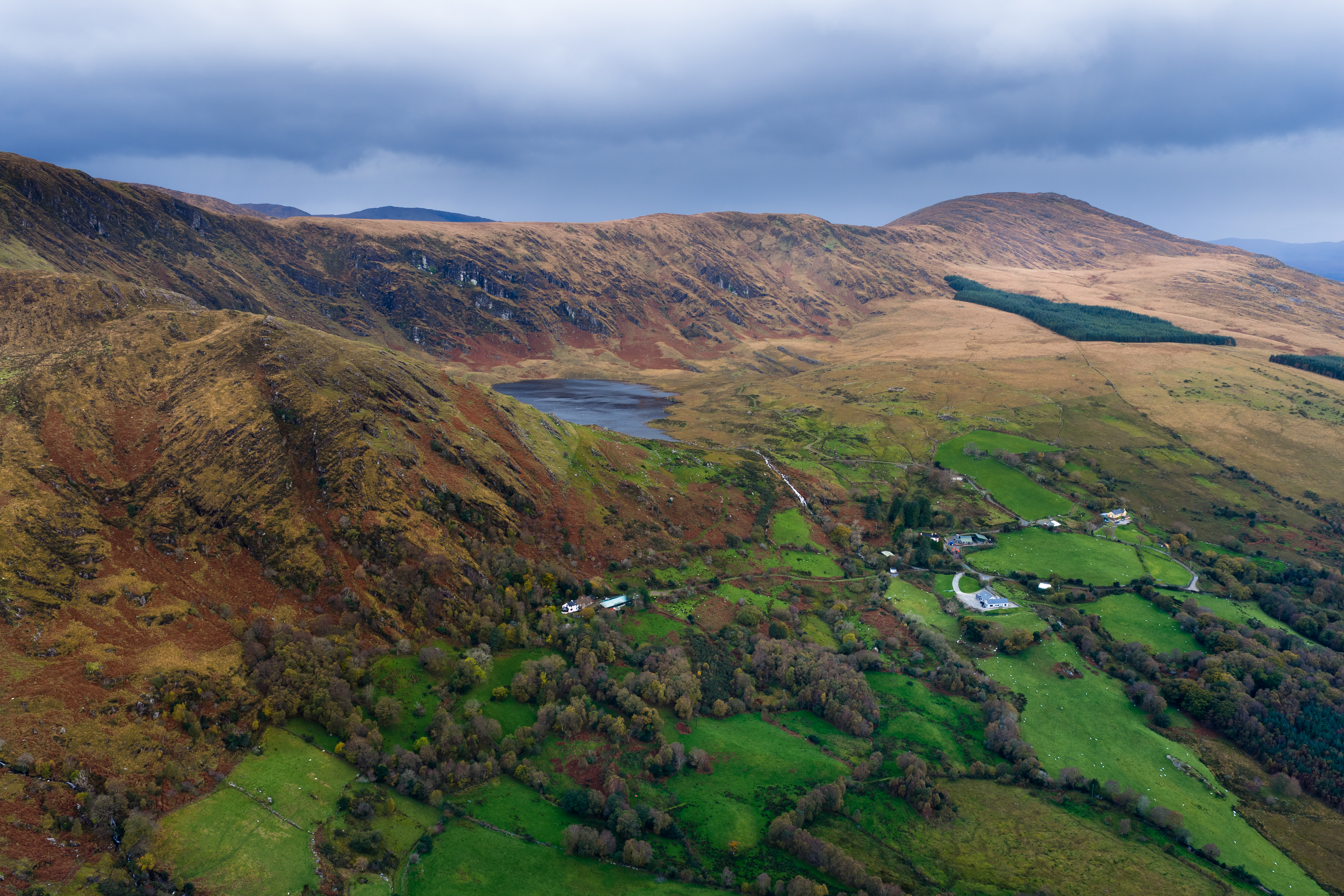
Some of the lower hills in the north-eastern part of Caha Mountains. Derrysallagh (the enlongated ridge in the center dominating over Cummer Lough) and Feorus East (the hill on the right). Slope of the Knocknagorraveela North East top visible to the very left.

== Ecology ==
The grassland is dominated by purple moor grass (Molinia caerulea), with some mat grass (Nardus stricta), Festuca spp. and Agrostis spp.. This thins out on the ridges and summits. The dry alpine heath supports heather (Calluna vulgaris), bell heather (Erica cinerea), crowberry (Empetrum nigrum), roseroot (Rhodiola rosea), St. Patrick's-cabbage (Saxifraga spathularis), heath bedstraw (Galium saxatile), dwarf willow (Salix herbacea) and viviparous fescue (Festuca vivipara), together with the ferns Wilson's filmy-fern (Hymenophyllum wilsonii), hard fern (Struthiopteris spicant ), brittle bladder-fern (Cystopteris fragilis), green spleenwort (Asplenium viride), fir clubmoss (Huperzia selago) and the moss Cyclodictyon laetevirens.

The Caha Mountains are notable for the presence of Minuartia recurva, a montane sandwort otherwise not found in Ireland. During a botanical survey of these mountains in 2000, over two hundred plants of the Alpine sandwort were found in each of its two known locations. Other rare plants were recorded; these included the heath pearlwort (Sagina subulata), the hybrid rush Juncus conglomeratus x J. effusus, and the marsh clubmoss Lycopodiella inundata, found in abundance on one rock ledge on Knockowen. The Killarney fern (Vandenboschia speciosa) can also be found here.

The Caha Mountains are home to the Kerry slug, otters, badgers, hares, lizards, brown trout and frogs. The peregrine falcon breeds here and the ring ouzel is one of the birds that visits the area during migration.

== See also ==
- List of mountains in Ireland

Media related to Caha Mountains at Wikimedia Commons
