= Deaths in October 2004 =

The following is a list of notable deaths in October 2004

Entries for each day are listed alphabetically by surname. A typical entry lists information in the following sequence:

- Name, age, country of citizenship at birth, subsequent country of citizenship (if applicable), reason for notability, cause of death (if known), and reference.

== October 2004 ==
=== 1 ===
- Richard Avedon, 81, American fashion and portrait photographer, cerebral hemorrhage.
- Frank Kendall Everest Jr., 84, American Air Force officer.
- Ron Hayes, 75, American television actor, suicide by jumping.
- Joyce Jillson, 58, American astrologer, newspaper columnist, author and actress, kidney failure.
- Gennadi Lushchikov, 56, Soviet Russian Olympic sports shooter (1976).
- Bruce Palmer, 58, Canadian bassist (Buffalo Springfield), heart attack.
- Aleksandr Rogov, 48, Soviet Olympic canoeist (1976).

=== 2 ===
- Shaul Amor, 63, Israeli politician.
- Bjørnar Andresen, 59, Norwegian jazz musician.
- Max Geldray, 88, Dutch jazz harmonica player often credited as the world's first, and Goon Show performer.
- Fialho Gouveia, 69, Portuguese radio and TV presenter, respiratory failure.
- Nelson Greene, 81, American football player (Tulsa Golden Hurricane, New York Yankees).
- Norm Schachter, 90, American gridiron football official and referee.
- Nick Skorich, 83, American NFL gridiron football player and coach (Philadelphia Eagles), complications from heart surgery.

=== 3 ===
- Vernon Alley, 89, American jazz bassist.
- Helmut Bantz, 83, German gymnast and Olympian (1952, 1956).
- Jacques Benveniste, 69, French immunologist and physician.
- Ken Brondell, 82, American baseball player (New York Giants).
- John Cerutti, 44, American Major League Baseball baseball player (Toronto Blue Jays, Detroit Tigers), announcer for the Toronto Blue Jays.
- Donald Wills Douglas, Jr., 87, American industrialist and Olympic sailor (1932).
- Matthäus Hetzenauer, 79, Austrian Wehrmacht sniper during World War II.
- Janet Leigh, 77, American actress (Psycho, The Manchurian Candidate, Touch of Evil), vasculitis.
- Frits van Turenhout, 91, Dutch sports journalist.

=== 4 ===
- Syd Bycroft, 92, English football player.
- Rodolfo Celletti, 87, Italian musicologist, critic, voice teacher, and novelist.
- Gordon Cooper, 77, American astronaut and aeronautical engineer, one of the original Mercury Seven, heart failure.
- Rio Diaz, 45, Filipino beauty queen, television presenter, actress and politician, colorectal cancer.
- Michael Grant, 89, British ancient historian.
- Emīlija Gudriniece, 84, Soviet/Latvian chemist.
- Nilamani Routray, 84, Indian politician and Chief Minister.

=== 5 ===
- Mario Ramón Beteta, 79, Mexican economist.
- Rodney Dangerfield, 82, American comedian and actor (Easy Money, Caddyshack, Back to School), Grammy winner (1981), complications from heart surgery.
- William H. Dobelle, 62, American biomedical researcher, eye doctor and artificial vision pioneer, complications of diabetes.
- Matti Jokinen, 68, Finnish Olympic sailor (1976).
- John Richards, 77, British Royal Marines general.
- Wayne Rutledge, 62, Canadian professional ice hockey player (Los Angeles Kings, Houston Aeros), stomach cancer.
- Maurice Wilkins, 87, New Zealand-British physicist and molecular biologist, Nobel laureate (Physiology or Medicine, 1962).

=== 6 ===
- Bailey Brown, 87, American judge.
- Eugen Horniak, 78, Slovak Olympic basketball player (1952).
- Daniel Janssens, 78, Belgian Olympic middle-distance runner (1952).
- Frederica de Laguna, 98, American anthropologist and archaeologist.
- Johnny Kelley, 97, American long-distance runner and Olympian (1936, 1948).
- William Clark, Baron Clark of Kempston, 86, British politician and peer.
- Pete McCarthy, 52, British travel writer and broadcaster, cancer.
- Marvin Santiago, 56, Puerto Rican salsa singer, complications of diabetes.
- Norm Schlueter, 88, American baseball player (Chicago White Sox, Cleveland Indians).
- Veríssimo Correia Seabra, 57, Bissau-Guinean military commander, beaten to death in mutiny.
- Clem Tholet, 56, Rhodesian singer and songwriter.
- Harbhajan Singh Yogi, 75, Indian spiritual leader and head of the Sikh Dharma in the western hemisphere, heart failure.

=== 7 ===
- Michael C. Astour, 87, Soviet-American professor of Yiddish and Russian literature.
- Kenneth Bigley, 62, British civil engineer taken hostage in Iraq, beheaded by hostage takers, decapitation.
- T. J. Binyon, 68, British author, Oxford professor, Pushkin scholar and crime novelist, heart attack.
- Wolfgang Grzyb, 64, German football player.
- Oscar Heisserer, 90, French football player.
- Tony Lanfranchi, 69, British racing driver, cancer.
- Miki Matsubara, 44, Japanese singer, cervical cancer.
- Rosemary Murray, 91, British chemist, Vice-Chancellor of the University of Cambridge (1975–1977).
- Jacques Noël, 84, French fencer and Olympian (1952).
- Hildy Parks, 78, American actress, writer and TV producer, complications of stroke.
- Július Toček, 65, Czechoslovak rower and Olympic medalist (1964).
- Nikola Dimitrov Tzanev, 64, Bulgarian football player and Olympian (1960).

=== 8 ===
- Jeannette Aubert, 84, French diver and Olympian (1948).
- James Chace, 72, American historian, heart attack.
- Irina Demick, 67, French actress.
- Tony Giuliani, 91, American baseball player (St. Louis Browns, Washington Senators, Brooklyn Dodgers).
- Mei Zhi, 90, Chinese children's author and essayist.
- Kenneth G. Mills, 81, Canadian philosopher and musician.
- Johnny Sturm, 88, American baseball player (New York Yankees) and minor league manager, congestive heart failure.
- Emanuel Mac Troutman, 89, American district judge (United States District Court for the Eastern District of Pennsylvania).

=== 9 ===
- Jorge Cánaves, 82, Argentine Olympic equestrian (1952, 1964).
- Jacques Derrida, 74, French philosopher (deconstruction), pancreatic cancer.
- Maxime Faget, 83, American aerospace engineer (NASA, Space Shuttle program), designer of the Mercury space capsule, bladder cancer.
- Tom Greenfield, 86, American football player (Green Bay Packers).
- Herschel Grossman, 65, American economist.
- Don McEvoy, 75, English football player and manager.
- Bryan R. Wilson, 78, British author of religious books.

=== 10 ===
- Josef Argauer, 93, Austrian football coach.
- Ângelo Bonfietti, 78, Brazilian basketball player and Olympian (1952, 1956).
- Ken Caminiti, 41, American baseball player, drug overdose.
- David G. Chandler, 70, British historian.
- Kelsey Jones, 82, Canadian composer, pianist, harpsichordist, and music teacher, kidney failure.
- Christopher Reeve, 52, American actor (Superman, The Remains of the Day, Deathtrap), heart failure.
- Arthur H. Robinson, 89, American cartographer and geographer.
- Maurice Shadbolt, 72, New Zealand novelist, playwright and journalist, Alzheimer's disease.
- John William Tebbel, 91, American journalist, editor, writer, teacher, and media historian.

=== 11 ===
- Paul Bryan, 91, British politician.
- Bobby Cook, 81, American basketball player (Wisconsin Badgers, Sheboygan Red Skins).
- Lord Nicholas Gordon-Lennox, 73, British diplomat, Ambassador to Spain (1984–1989).
- Michael Hobelsberger, 69, German Olympic ice hockey player (1960, 1964).
- Elisabeth Klein, 93, Hungarian-Danish pianist.
- Ben Komproe, 62, Netherlands Antilles politician, Prime Minister (2003) and Minister of Justice (2003–2004), complications from gastric surgery.
- Mary Loos, 94, American actress, screenwriter, and novelist, complications from stroke.
- Peter Kerr, 12th Marquess of Lothian, 82, British peer, politician and landowner.
- Keith Miller, 84, Australian cricketer, Australian rules footballer, fighter pilot and journalist.
- Csaba Pálinkás, 45, Hungarian Olympic cyclist (1980).
- Gulshan Rai, 80, Indian film producer and distributor.
- Fernando Sabino, 80, Brazilian writer and journalist, cancer.
- Josiane Serre, 81, French academic chemist, teacher, pioneer of quantum chemistry.

=== 12 ===
- Tommy Kalmanir, 78, American football player (Los Angeles Rams, Baltimore Colts).
- Samson Kutsuwada, 57, Japanese wrestler, acute myeloid leukemia.
- Jackie McGrory, 62, Scottish football player.
- Shigehiro Ozawa, 82, Japanese film director and screenwriter.

=== 13 ===
- Mike Blyzka, 75, American baseball player (St. Louis Browns/Baltimore Orioles).
- Erik Bye, 78, Norwegian journalist, radio/TV host, actor, and singer/songwriter, cancer.
- Enrique M. Fernando, 89, Filipino judge and Chief Justice of the Supreme Court.
- David Grose, 59, American archaeologist and classicist.
- Grethe Holmer, 80, Danish actress.
- Tatyana Karakashyants, 78, Soviet Russian diver and Olympian (1952, 1956).
- Nirupa Roy, 73, Indian film actress, heart attack.
- Bernice Rubens, 76, British Booker Prize-winning novelist (The Elected Member), complications from stroke.
- Ivor Wood, 72, British animator (Paddington Bear, The Wombles Postman Pat), cancer.
- Tetsu Yano, 80, Japanese science fiction writer and translato, colorectal cancer.

=== 14 ===
- Peter Adelaar, 57, Dutch judoka and Olympian (1980).
- Magdolna Bartha, 74, Hungarian Olympic cross-country skier (1960).
- Ted Blakey, 79, American historian, activist, and businessman.
- Juan Francisco Fresno, 90, Chilean Roman Catholic prelate, Archbishop of Santiago de Chile (1983–1990).
- Mohamed Zahir Ismail, 80, Malaysian lawyer and politician, kidney failure.
- Cordell Jackson, 81, American rockabilly musician.
- Al Kaporch, 91, American football player (Detroit Lions).
- Sheila Keith, 84, British actress.
- Lokesh, 57, Indian actor.
- Conrad Russell, 5th Earl Russell, 67, British peer, historian and member of the House of Lords, complications of emphysema.
- Ivan Shamiakin, 83, Soviet Belarusian writer.
- Dattopant Thengadi, 83, Indian Hindu ideologue and trade union leader.

=== 15 ===
- Bill Eyden, 74, British jazz drummer.
- Dave Godin, 68, British soul music promoter and journalist, coined the term "northern soul".
- Per Højholt, 76, Danish poet.
- Irv Novick, 88, American comic book artist (Batman, The Flash, Superman).
- Thiruthuraipoondi Radhakrishnan Pappa, 81, Indian music director of Tamil, Telugu and Sinhalese films.
- Tex Ritter, 80, American professional basketball player (Eastern Kentucky, New York Knicks).

=== 16 ===
- Doug Bennett, 52, Canadian rock singer (Doug and the Slugs).
- Vincent Brome, 94, British biographer and novelist.
- Susana Campos, 70, Argentine actress, brain cancer.
- Don Carlson, 85, American basketball player (Chicago Stags, Minneapolis Lakers, Baltimore Bullets).
- Paul Juntunen, 83, American basketball player.
- Harold Perkin, 77, English social historian.
- Pierre Salinger, 79, American journalist and Press Secretary to John Fitzgerald Kennedy and Lyndon B. Johnson, heart failure.
- Tomasz Strzembosz, 74, Polish historian and writer.
- Bassam Zuamut, 53, Israeli Arab actor (HaMis'ada HaGdola) and screenwriter, kidney disease.

=== 17 ===
- Harry Almond, 76, British Olympic rower (1952).
- Waldir Villas Boas, 79, Brazilian footballer and Olympian (1952).
- Ray Boone, 81, American Major League Baseball player, patriarch of first third-generation MLB family.
- Wu Faxian, 89, Chinese revolutionary and military officer, commander of the People's Liberation Army Air Force.
- Julius Harris, 81, American actor (Live and Let Die, Super Fly, The Taking of Pelham One Two Three), heart failure.
- Uzi Hitman, 52, Israeli singer, songwriter and composer, heart attack.
- Bas Pease, 81, British physicist.
- Franco Prosperi, 78, Italian film director and screenwriter.
- Andreas Sassen, 36, German football player, stroke.

=== 18 ===
- Nancy Carline, 94, British artist.
- Edwin Arthur Hall, 95, American politician, member of the United States House of Representatives (1939-1953).
- Richie Lemos, 84, Mexican-American boxer.
- Elizabeth Nicholls, 58, American-Canadian paleontologist, cancer.
- Fermin Rocker, 96, British painter and book illustrator.
- Veerappan, 52, Indian criminal known as "Jungle Cat", shot by Special Task Force.
- Viktor Zubarev, 31, Kazakhstani football player, drug overdose.

=== 19 ===
- Antoine Abel, 69, Seychellois writer.
- Anita Bitri, 36, Albanian pop singer, carbon monoxide poisoning.
- Frank Chapple, 83, British trade unionist (General Secretary of EETPU, 1966–1984).
- Kenneth E. Iverson, 84, Canadian computer scientist, inventor of the APL programming language, stroke.
- Sang Lee, 51, Korean-American three-cushion billiard player, stomach cancer.
- Elizabeth May McClintock, 92, American botanist.
- Veljko Milatović, 82, Montenegrin communist partisan, politician, and President (1967-1969, 1974-1982).
- Paul Nitze, 97, American diplomat and Cold War arms negotiator, pneumonia.
- Calvin Ruck, 79, Canadian member of Parliament (Senate of Canada representing Nova Scotia).
- Greg Shaw, 55, American rock music journalist and record label executive, heart attack.
- Lewis Urry, 77, Canadian chemical engineer and inventor (alkaline battery, lithium battery).

=== 20 ===
- Virgil Bărbuceanu, 77, Romanian Olympic equestrian (1956, 1960).
- William Brown, 66, American operatic tenor.
- Veronika Cherkasova, 45, Belarusian journalist, stabbed.
- Tevfik Gelenbe, 73, Turkish actor and comedian, complications of cancer.
- Anthony Hecht, 81, American poet, lymphoma.
- Chuck Hiller, 70, American Major League Baseball baseball player and coach, first National League player to hit a World Series grand slam, leukemia.
- Nietzchka Keene, 52, American film director and writer, pancreatic cancer.
- Lynda Lee-Potter, 69, British newspaper columnist (Daily Mail), brain tumour, brain cancer.
- Ildo Lobo, 50, Cape Verdean singer.
- Olive Wadham, 95, English swimmer and Olympian (1936).
- Choi Yong-kee, 78, South Korean Olympic triple jumper (1952, 1956).

=== 21 ===
- Adnan al-Ghoul, Palestinian Hamas chief explosives expert, alleged "father" of the Qassam rocket, targeted killing by the IDF.
- Sharifa Alkhateeb, 58, American teacher and writer, pancreatic cancer.
- Jim Bucher, 93, American baseball player (Brooklyn Dodgers, St. Louis Cardinals, Boston Red Sox).
- Neil Campbell, 58, American scientist, heart attack.
- Jean Dondelinger, 73, Luxembourgish diplomat and civil servant.
- Everett Rogers, 73, American communication scholar and sociologist, founder of diffusion of innovations theory.
- Victoria Snelgrove, 21, American college junior, shot with pepper spray projectile by Boston Police.

=== 22 ===
- Hub Bechtol, 78, American football player (Texas Tech Red Raiders, Texas Longhorns, Baltimore Colts).
- Louis Bouyer, 91, French Catholic priest and Lutheran minister.
- Galeazzo Dondi, 89, Italian Olympic basketball player (1936), and basketball coach.
- Samuel L. Gravely, Jr., 82, American naval pioneer (first African American fleet commander and admiral), complications from stroke.
- Helmut Hadwiger, 82, Austrian Olympic ski jumper (1948).
- Ricky Miller, 34, American racing driver.
- Katherine Victor, 81, American cult film actress, stroke.
- Pedro Vilardebo, 51, Spanish racing cyclist.

=== 23 ===
- Edward T. Cone, 87, American composer, music theorist, pianist, and philanthropist.
- Jim McDonald, 77, American baseball player.
- Robert Merrill, 87, American operatic baritone.
- Bill Nicholson, 85, British football manager (Tottenham Hotspur, 1958–1974), player, coach, and scout.
- George Silk, 87, New Zealand WWII photojournalist (Life), congestive heart failure.
- Wilson Wood, 89, American actor.

=== 24 ===
- Dario Di Palma, 71, Italian film cinematographer.
- Bethany Goldsmith, 77, American baseball player.
- James Aloysius Hickey, 84, American Roman Catholic Cardinal, Archbishop of Washington, D.C. (1980–2000).
- Isao Imai, 90, Japanese theoretical physicist.
- Maaja Ranniku, 63, Estonian chess International Master, women's Soviet chess champion, ten-time Estonian women's chess champion.
- Herbert Schilling, 74, German Olympic boxer (1952).
- Notable Americans killed in the 2004 Martinsville plane crash:
  - Randy Dorton, 50, engine builder (Hendrick Motorsports).
  - Ricky Hendrick, 24, NASCAR stock car driver and partial team owner.

=== 25 ===
- Billy Carden, 80, American racing driver.
- Thomas Kanza, 71, Congolese diplomat and ambassador, heart attack.
- A. David Mazzone, 76, American district judge (United States District Court for the District of Massachusetts).
- Shyam Nandan Prasad Mishra, 84, Indian politician (foreign minister, 1979–1980), cardiac arrest.
- John Peel, 65, English radio presenter and journalist, heart attack.
- Jerzy Ustupski, 93, Polish rower and Olympic medalist (1936).
- Bernie Weiner, 86, American football player (Brooklyn Dodgers).

=== 26 ===
- Albino Alverà, 81, Italian Olympic alpine skier (1952).
- Bobby Ávila, 79, Mexican MLB All-Star and American League batting champion (1954), complications of diabetes.
- Helen Elsie Austin, 96, American attorney, civil rights leader, and diplomat.
- Russ Derry, 88, American baseball player (New York Yankees, Philadelphia Athletics, St. Louis Cardinals).
- Robin Kenyatta, 62, American jazz alto saxophonist.
- Patricia Knight, 89, American actress.
- Ricardo Odnoposoff, 90, Austrian violinist.
- Fred Paine, 78, American basketball player (Providence Steamrollers).

=== 27 ===
- Vladimir Arkhipov, 71, Soviet army general and politician.
- Hermione Cobbold, Baroness Cobbold, 99, British aristocrat.
- Claude Helffer, 82, French pianist.
- Olavi Laaksonen, 83, Finnish Olympic football player (1952).
- Lester Lanin, 97, American jazz big band leader.
- Lasse Nordvall, 76, Swedish Olympic cyclist (1952, 1956).
- Marwell Periotti, 65, Argentine Olympic footballer (1960).
- V. V. Raghavan, 81, Indian communist politician.
- Zdenko Runjić, 62, Croatian songwriter, stroke.
- Paulo Sérgio Oliveira da Silva, 30, Brazilian footballer (São Caetano), heart attack during match.

=== 28 ===
- Muhammad Alawi al-Maliki, 56, Saudi traditional Sunni Islamic scholar.
- Rosalind Christie, 85, British literary guardian and the only child of Agatha Christie.
- Maria Fiore, 69, Italian film and television actress, lung cancer.
- Edgardo Fulgencio, 86, Filipino basketball player and Olympian (1948).
- Jimmy McLarnin, 96, British boxer, two-time welterweight world champion (1933, 1934).
- Gil Mellé, 72, American artist, jazz saxophonist and film and television composer, heart attack.
- George S. Schairer, 91, American aerodynamics expert at Boeing.
- Ted Taylor, 79, Mexican-American theoretical physicist and nuclear weapon designere, coronary artery disease.
- Charles F. Wheeler, 88, American cinematographer (Tora! Tora! Tora!, Freaky Friday, Condorman), Alzheimer's disease.

=== 29 ===
- Natalya Baranskaya, 96, Soviet writer of short stories and novellas.
- Princess Alice, Duchess of Gloucester, 102, British royal, aunt of Queen Elizabeth II, stroke.
- Jacinto João, 60, Portuguese footballer, heart attack.
- Shosei Koda, 24, Japanese backpacker, beheaded by Al-Qaeda in Iraq-terrorists.
- Edward Oliver LeBlanc, 81, Dominican political leader, chief minister (1961–1967) and premier (1967–1974).
- Vaughn Meader, 68, American Grammy-winning comedian and JFK impersonator, emphysema.
- Gerard Ross Norton, 89, South African soldier and Victoria Cross recipient (1944).
- Ezra Stoller, 89, American architectural photographer.
- Pierre Thibaud, 75, French classical trumpeter.
- Peter Twinn, 88, British mathematician, codebreaker during World War II, and entomologist.

=== 30 ===
- Abdur Rahim, 72, Bangladeshi footballer and manager.
- Earl Dodd, 79, American basketball player (Denver Nuggets).
- Brian André Doyle, 93, British judge, Attorney General of Fiji and Chief Justice of Zambia.
- Dame Phyllis Frost, 87, Australian welfare worker and philanthropist.
- David José Kohon, 75, Argentine film director and screenwriter.
- Rein Otsason, 73, Estonian economist and banker, heart failure.
- Peggy Ryan, 80, American actress (All Ashore, Hawaii Five-O), singer and dancer, stroke.
- David Shulman, 91, American lexicographer and cryptographer.
- Ed Waters, 74, American writer for film and television.

=== 31 ===
- Mari Aldon, 78, Lithuanian-American actress.
- Don Briscoe, 64, American stage and television actor (Dark Shadows), heart disease.
- Roland Gibbs, 83, British Field Marshal.
- David Gore-Booth, 61, British diplomat.
- Valentin Nikolayev, 80, Soviet Olympic wrestler (1956).
- Russell Reinke, 82, Canadian politician, member of the House of Commons of Canada (1953-1957).
- Marie Tehan, 64, Australian Liberal politician (Victorian Parliament, 1987–1999), Creutzfeldt–Jakob disease.
