= African Americans in South Dakota =

Black South Dakotans
Total population
- 17,842 (2020)

Regions with significant populations
- Sioux Falls, Yankton

Black South Dakotans are residents of the U.S. state of South Dakota who are of African-American ancestry. African Americans have been present in South Dakota since before its statehood, when the area was part of Dakota Territory.

== History ==
=== Pre-statehood ===
The earliest known Black person to have entered what would become South Dakota was York, an explorer and enslaved man who accompanied Clark on the Lewis and Clark Expedition in 1804. Recounting an enounter with local Native Americans, Clark wrote in his journal, "York made Inds. believe that he had been wild like bear & tamed.... Those who had seen whites and not blacks thought him something strange and from his very large size more vicious than whites. Those who had seen neither made no difference between white & black".

==== Dakota Territory ====
When Dakota Territory was established in 1862, Governor William Jayne urged the legislature to prohibit slavery. Until 1868, language in its organic act prohibited non-white men from voting and barred non-white children from attending public schools; the word "white" in both cases was removed in 1868. By 1870, 94 African Americans had moved to the territory, many moving from the Gulf Coast by way of the Missouri River. These earliest African-American settlers primarily settled in Yankton, Buffalo, and Bon Homme Counties, and in settlements like Yankton.

On George Armstrong Custer's Black Hills Expedition of 1874, the only woman in attendance was Sarah Campbell, an African-American woman who worked as the group's cook. Campbell is reported to have been the first non-Native American woman to have entered the Black Hills and was the first Black South Dakotan woman to own property and ran her own business. During the resultant Black Hills gold rush, several African Americans moved to the Black Hills, as many as 100 by 1880. Nat Love was a prominent cowboy who lived in Deadwood during the 1870s, where he won several sharpshooting and cattle roping competitions.

During the 1880s, the 25th Infantry Regiment, a segregated division of Buffalo Soldiers, was stationed at several Dakota Territory forts: first at Fort Randall, then Fort Hale, and finally at Fort Meade. The 25th quelled conflicts between the U.S. government and settlers with Native Americans, provided disaster relief to settlers after heavy flooding in 1881, and participated in civil duties. During 1881, members of the 25th accompanied Sitting Bull from Saskatchewan, Canada, to Fort Randall, where he would be imprisoned for two years. Conflicts between local residents of Sturgis arose in 1885, resulting in one lynching of a soldier, two civilian deaths, and a raid by soldiers on a brothel. One resident wrote to President Grover Cleveland asking that the regiment be reassigned. The letter was forwarded to Alfred Terry, then commander of the Dakota Territory troops, who reviewed the situation and rejected the request. The 25th stayed at Fort Meade until 1892.

=== Statehood and early 20th century ===
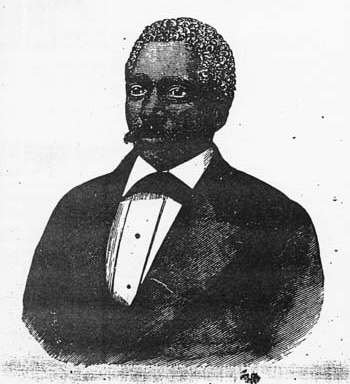
Norvel Blair, the patriarch of the Blair Colony's founding family

Beginning in the 1880s, several African-American families began moving to Yankton. They established the Allen African Methodist Episcopal Church in 1885. At that time, the social atmosphere between Black and White South Dakotans was described as friendly.

In 1883, the Blair family, led by Norvel Blair, settled homestead claims in rural Sully County. In 1906, Benjamin Blair and other Black community leaders met in Yankton to found the Northwestern Homestead Movement with the purpose of encouraging other Black families to move to South Dakota. As more families joined the Blairs in Sully County, the area became known as Blair Colony or the Sully County Colored Colony.

During the late 19th and early 20th centuries, other African Americans settled in urban centers like Yankton, Sioux Falls, Huron, and Mitchell; or in more rural areas like Edgemont and Mellette County. Many established Black churches, such as Allen African Methodist Episcopal Church and the Second Baptist Church in Yankton, Pilgrim Baptist Church and St. John's Baptist Church in Sioux Falls, and Bethel African Methodist Episcopal in Huron.

The Black community in Yankton was supported by Tom Douglas or Christopher Columbus Yancey, who opened a saloon there and encouraged Black families from other states to move to South Dakota. At its peak, the Black population in Yankton reached about 350 to 400 people. Many worked custodial or domestic jobs, while others worked at the local cement plant. When it closed in 1910, most families migrated elsewhere.

Population growth briefly slowed during World War I but resumed again in the 1920s. The 1920 US Census counted 832 Black South Dakotans, 144 of whom were in Yankton and 83 in Sioux Falls. By this time, anti-Black racism began to increase in South Dakota, which before had largely consisted of isolated incidents. The Ku Klux Klan saw a statewide increase in membership during this time and held marches in Sioux Falls and burned crosses in Yankton and the Black Hills. In response, Black residents of Sioux Falls and Yankton founded branches of the National Association for the Advancement of Colored People (NAACP). In 1930, the first Get-To-Gether Picnic, a gathering of Black South Dakotans, was held. The event later grew to attract African Americans from neighbouring states. The picnic was held annually until 1961.

The Great Depression and Dust Bowl heavily affected all South Dakotans. In 1930, only 308 of the 646 Black South Dakotans counted in the 1930 US Census were employed. Louise Mitchell, a Sioux Falls cosmetologist, founded the Booker T. Washington Service Center in 1930, a charity to help impoverished and homeless local African Americans. Many Black South Dakotans found work in Sioux Falls as cosmetologists, studying under Mitchell and James Moxley. Others joined the Civilian Conservation Corps or worked in construction. Many Black South Dakotans moved away due to the harships of the Great Depression, many seeking fortune elsewhere. Blair Colony was largely abandoned by 1940 as most of its residents moved away, looking for work.

During World War II, many Black South Dakotans enlisted in the military, and assigned to segregated squadrons. To improve troop morale, a branch of the United Service Organizations was opened in the basement of the St. John's Baptist Church in Sioux Falls. This group also functioned as a resource for Black servicemembers to find lodging. It later expanded into its own building at 115 North Dakota Avenue.

=== Civil rights era ===
Around 1950, the NAACP was restructured and renovated. Two new chapters of fraternal organizations, the Prince Hall Alpha Lodge of Free and Accepted Masons, Omega chapter of the Order of the Eastern Star, were founded by Black community leaders across the state.

Although South Dakota did not have any large-scale demonstrations during the civil rights era, it felt the effects of nationwide policy changes in its wake and had its own civil rights advances. South Dakota had its own committee for the United States Commission on Civil Rights (CCR) established in 1957. The South Dakota Civil Rights Council was founded in 1961 to promote civil rights and address racial prejudice. Martin Luther King, Jr. arrived in Sioux Falls in January 1961 and was honored at a reception at the Sheraton Hotel.

During this time, the NAACP conducted a statewide survey of treatment of African Americans and found significant evidence of discrimination, especially barring African Americans from visiting certain businesses. A 1961 survey by the Black Hills Civil Rights Committee reported that Black South Dakotans were barred from 92% of taverns and 86% of bars or nightclubs in Rapid City; (Note: Contemporary South Dakota law defined bars as drinking establishments licensed to sell hard liquor and taverns as not serving anything stronger than low alcohol beer.) follow-up surveys by other organizations found the refusal rate to be between 80 and 88%. Similarly, high refusal rates were reported in hair salons and barbershops, hotels and motels, restaurants, and other venues.

The New York Times also published an article on racial segregation in South Dakota, bringing the state into the national spotlight. The CCR subsequently launched its own investigation, and a committee meeting to discuss the various reports of discrimination was held on December 11, 1962. The following year, the CCR also published a report, "Negro Airmen in a Northern Community: Discrimination in Rapid City, South Dakota", which found high levels of segregation and prejudice against Black airmen serving at Ellsworth Air Force Base near Rapid City, reporting difficulties in housing, being refused service at businessess, and segregated education. The CCR report prompted the passage of South Dakota Senate Bill 1, which prohibited discrimination based on "race, color, religion, or national origin" in establishments serving the public. Yankton businessman and community leader Ted Blakey was appointed the head of the Emancipation Proclamation Committee, which oversaw the passage of the Twenty-fourth Amendment to the United States Constitution, which prohibited poll taxes, in South Dakota. These efforts were supported by the state NAACP and passed on 23 January 1964.

== Culture ==
The South Dakota African American History Museum opened in the Washington Pavilion of Arts and Science in Sioux Falls in 2008.

== Demographics ==
Historical population
Census	Pop.	Note	%±
1890	541		—
1900	465		−14.0%
1910	817		75.7%
1920	832		1.8%
1930	545		−34.5%
1940	474		−13.0%
1950	727		53.4%
1960	1,114		53.2%
1970	1,627		46.1%
1980	2,152		32.3%
1990	3,291		52.9%
2000	4,685		42.4%
2010	10,207		117.9%
2020	17,842		74.8%
2023 (est.)	22,730		27.4%
U.S. Decennial Census, 2000–2020 (Note: Figures do not include individuals who self-identified as multiracial.)

During the 2020 United States census, 17,842 respondents identified solely as Black or African American; 26,307 reported this identity alone or in combination with one or more other races. Of those identifying solely as Black or African American, 10,120 were male and 7,722 were female, and the median age was 26 years. In total, there were 5,576 households; of these, 1,269 were owned housing and 4,307 were renting.

Prior to 2000, only 9.8% of South Dakota's immigrants originated in Africa. By 2009, that number had increased to 27.2%; and again to 31.3% since 2010. A 2018 report by the American Immigration Council found that Sudan and Ethiopia were two of the countries where most of South Dakota's immigrants originated from. Most of South Dakota's refugees come from the Democratic Republic of the Congo.

== Notable people ==
This is a list of notable African Americans who were born, raised, or spent a significant amount of time in South Dakota.

- Cleveland Abbott, athlete and educator
- Nat Love, cowboy and writer
- Oscar Micheaux, filmmaker

== Bibliography ==
- Bernson, Sara L.; Eggers, Robert J. (1977). "Black People in South Dakota History" (PDF). South Dakota History. 7 (3): 241–270.
- Friefeld, Jacob K.; Eckstrom, Mikal Brotnov; Edwards, Richard (Winter 2019). "African American Homesteader "Colonies" in the Settling of the Great Plains" (PDF). Great Plains Quarterly. 39 (1): 11–37. doi:10.1353/gpq.2019.0001.
- South Dakota Advisory Committee to the United States Commission on Civil Rights (March 1963). Negro Airmen in a Northern Community: Discrimination in Rapid City, South Dakota (PDF) (Report). United States Commission on Civil Rights – via University of Maryland Law Library.
