= MacCarthy's Bar =

Public house in County Cork, Ireland

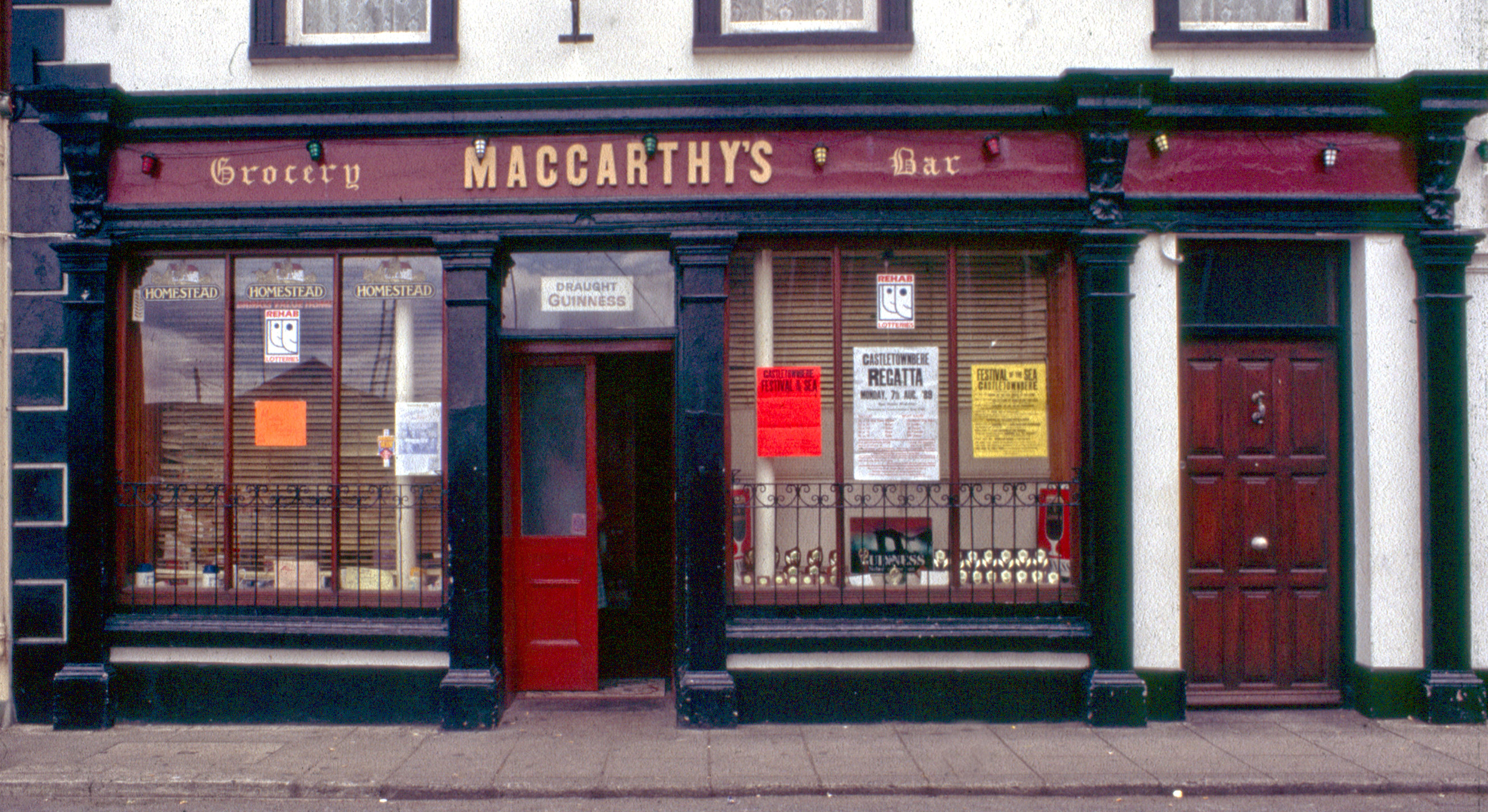
- MacCarthy's Bar in 1989
- Interactive map of MacCarthy's Bar

Restaurant information
- Owner: Adrienne
- Location: Castletownbere, County Cork, Ireland
- Coordinates: 51°39′06″N 09°54′37″W
- Website: Official website

MacCarthy's Bar, originally called McCarthy's Bar and also known as MacCarthy's Bar and Grocery, is a public house in the town of Castletownbere, County Cork in Ireland, founded by Michael McCarthy who began trading in 1860. It was later the home of Michael McCarthy's grandson, Air Commodore Aidan MacCarthy. In 2000, the pub gained widespread attention when it featured in and appeared on the front cover of Pete McCarthy's best-selling book McCarthy's Bar.

It was initially a grocery business which expanded to trade with the nearby Royal Navy base at the harbour, and then became McCarthy's Bar, selling beer, wine and spirits, one of the first licensed premises in the town. Michael McCarthy's youngest son, Denis Florence (D. F.) McCarthy, had the premises refurbished by craftsmen who came to construct a nearby church between 1907 and 1911. To distinguish the family from a neighbour with the same name, the McCarthys became MacCarthy.

In 1979, Adrienne MacCarthy, great-granddaughter of Michael, moved to Cork and took over the running of the bar, to avoid it closing after the death of an uncle. It still sells groceries and has a bar at the back.

== Origins ==
MacCarthy's Bar and Grocery is located on the market square in Castletownbere, County Cork in Ireland. It was initially a grocery store founded by Michael McCarthy, an Irish general merchant who started doing business in 1860. As his business expanded, he began to trade with the nearby Royal Navy base at the harbour. He salted locally bought fish and sold it to the large ships. With time he adapted his business to run hand-in-hand with whatever was in demand including importing coal and salt. The grocery store later expanded to become McCarthy's Bar, selling beer, wine and spirits, one of the first licensed premises in the town.

== 20th century ==
Later, Michael and his wife Eileen had three sons, Timothy who emigrated, John D. who studied law and the youngest Denis Florence (D.F.) MacCarthy, who stayed on to run the family business. D.F. continued its success and became known as Lord High Admiral of Berehaven. He married Julia in 1904 and a year later they had the first of 10 children. Between 1907 and 1911, a new church was being constructed in the town and D.F. employed their craftsman to refurbish the bar using left-over materials. Italian craftsmen tiled the floor and included a mosaic inscription of D.F McCarthy at the entrance and new shelves were installed. Until at least 1911, it was known as McCarthy's Bar. To distinguish the family from a neighbour with the same name, D.F. changed their surname from McCarthy to MacCarthy. After the death of Michael, D.F. moved his family into the apartment above the bar, where in 1913 their sixth child, Aidan MacCarthy was born. During the First World War the business prospered following with increasing trade with American employers and an extra storey was added to the building.

In 1979, Aidan's daughter, Adrienne, left her career in nursing, to at first temporarily but then permanently, move to the area and take over the running of the bar, to avoid it closing after the death of an uncle.

It gained widespread attention when it featured in and appeared on the front cover of Pete McCarthy's best-selling book McCarthy's Bar (2000). Chapter six in his book focused on the evening he spent there. He described the premises as "the front half is a grocer's shop with seats for drinkers; the back half, a bar with groceries". It still is. The "fridge full of dairy products" still contains milk, eggs, Galtee cheese and butter, but it now also has bottles of wine. The grocery shelves are still "well-stocked" with tinned beans, spam, ketchup and chickpeas. When he used it for his front cover, he wanted it to match the spelling of his own name so he had the "a" in "Mac" erased. The cover also staged a member of staff in a nun's costume posing with a pint of Guinness and the owner's dog was captured accidentally.

== 21st century ==
MacCarthy's has become a tourist attraction and is run by Adrienne and Niki MacCarthy, daughters of Aidan. It houses the ceremonial sword gifted to him by Isao Kusuno, a Japanese officer during the Second World War. Food is sold between 11 am and 4 pm, live music is played and (as of 2020) it had 12 staff.

During the COVID-19 pandemic in 2020, MacCarthy's remained closed for the longest period in its history.
