= Desperately Seeking Something =

British television series

- Pete explaining that the following commercial break can be a learning experience, in his usual comical sarcasm
- Directed by: Steve Connelly
- Starring: Pete McCarthy
- Original language: English
- No. of series: 3
- No. of episodes: 14

Production
- Producer: Kudos Film and Television
- Running time: 25 min. per episode

Original release
- Network: Channel 4
- Release: 1995 – 1998

Desperately Seeking Something is a British television series first broadcast on 6 November 1995, presented by travel writer and presenter Pete McCarthy. In it, McCarthy looked at various spiritual practices from across the globe, looking at both long standing traditional beliefs as well as 'alternate' religions which began to flourish in the 1990s. He met a variety of practitioners and participated in their rituals. It ran for three series, with the first two series focusing on practitioners located in the British Isles. The second series looked more at Christian and Pagan sects, including the Fellowship of Isis and the Golden Dawn. The third series saw him looking at world traditional beliefs like Australian Aboriginal beliefs and Hawaiian religion.

Before going on what would be referred to as a "spiritual journey", McCarthy said "I've taken on the role of everyman, I'm like lots of people who have given up religion and never replaced it with anything else."

== Episodes ==
A complete list of episodes. All episodes were written and presented by Pete McCarthy, and directed by Steve Connelly. All three series were produced by Kudos Film and Television.

=== Series 1 (1995) ===
No.	Title
1	"Travels With My Aura"
Pete McCarthy starts the series with a visit to Stonehenge on the Summer Solstice, and there he observes a group of worshippers. He leaves there and travels on to the north west of Scotland, to Scoraig Peninsula and stays at Samadhan (which means "the answer") to practise some "Mongolian toning and overtoning". After this he moves on to visit Richard Lawrence at the Aetherius Society where he learns that Jesus came from the planet Venus, and observes some of the society's rituals. Finally McCarthy travels to West Wales to visit The Light Centre where David Saltrees (sp) distills the essence of the planets to help people balance their chakras. We end with McCarthy entering a flotation tank where he chants "Ni".
2	"McCarthy's Witch-Hunt"
McCarthy meets a group of Odinists, living in Tuffnell Park, London. We learn from their High Priestess, Freya Aswynn, that they believe in rebuilding a society where community is strong again, the elderly are supported and respected and young people are taught the skills of working with their hands. McCarthy leaves the Odinists to visit Molly Fairley, a London based psychic healer and clairvoyant. He talks about how Molly reveals things about him that no one else knew, and he is convinced of her clairvoyant powers. We also learn that Uranus is the planet controlling television. He leaves there and travels to Glastonbury, and to Shambhala which is run by a woman who claims to have lived many previous lives. She leads him through a trance, using the colours of flowers, which he finds quite powerful. He also meets Annie Wildwood, a pagan priestess, who similarly takes him through a trance, using visions of landscape to help him navigate through it. He leaves Glastonbury and returns to Balham in south London to the House of the Goddess, which started in 1985. It is run by a priestess of the Goddess, Shan Jayran. He describes his time with Shan as very moving, and emotional, and describes how she taught him an important lesson about not being quick to judge others.
3	"The Warrior Within"
McCarthy travels to mid-Wales to take part in an initiation ritual to search for the "warrior within", led by an Irish shaman, Shivam O'Brien and it takes a day and a night. It is all part of the Spirit Horse Nomadic Circle Camp, which was founded in 1989 by Shivam O'Brien and Erika Indra. Each summer the Foundation set up camp in a hidden valley on land owned by The Forest of Dreams. The Foundation's rituals are built on a mixture of Buddhist, Celtic and Native American spiritual beliefs. While there McCarthy has to travel into a dark tunnel where he must face his anxieties. After this he is placed into a trance by the "stone medicine woman". Then finally he joins the group in a sweat lodge, where McCarthy discovers a piece of porcelain that falls from his bottom.
4	"Pan's People"
The final episode in the series is a 50 minute special. It starts with a meeting between McCarthy and Ivan McBeth. He believes the Earth is intersected by meridians and channels, and he builds stone circles upon them as a form of healing acupuncture for the planet and to tap into the Earth's energy. McCarthy leaves Ivan McBeth to join the Golden Dawn Occult Society in a ritual at the ancient burial chamber of West Kennet Long Barrow in Wiltshire where they invoke Pan. During the invocation they experience a Seidr trance. McCarthy travels to Hampstead, London, to meet Ann Lloyd a practitioner of Aura Soma. Aura Soma uses the energy of colours to provide equilibrium and balance to a person's energy system. McCarthy selects the colour combination violet and blue as his choice if he could only take one to a desert island. McCarthy leaves London and travels to Holy Isle to visit Lama Yeshe Losal Rinpoche. Holy Isle provides spiritual, but non-religious, retreats and Lama Yeshe Losal Rinpoche is seeking to make the Isle the planet's spiritual interface. The episode finishes at Battersea Park Peace Pagoda, London, with author William Bloom for a review of what makes New Age beliefs so prevalent and attractive.

=== Series 2 (1996) ===
No.	Title
1	"The Wicca Man"
In the first episode, McCarthy first travels to Hampstead, London, to meet Paul Saki (sp) and experience rebirthing. From there he goes on to meet a hypnotherapist, Stephen Russell, known as The Barefoot Doctor. Stephen places 25 needles in McCarthy's head and then sings, all to help him reconnect with his "spirit-body". After this McCarthy goes on to meet Nicholas, who has trained in the Hawaiian art of Kahuna bodywork. He then travels to the Acorn Centre in Glastonbury where he meets a woman who guides him through "the crowning ceremony" to unlock his DNA from extraterrestrial control. We discover that McCarthy has "wobbly muscles" which he is informed is a sign that he has been reborn from earlier incarnations with some DNA already rejoined. Finally he joins Vivianne Crowley's coven of Wiccans in the Brecon Beacons, Wales, for their Summer Solstice. He is invited to be the first ever to film the fertility ritual to the Wiccan Sun god, on condition that he takes the part of the Wicca Man.
2	"Safe Sects"
In the second episode, McCarthy travels to Tintagel, Cornwall, to consider who lives in detached bungalows and there he meets a group of Qabalists. From there he travels to a suburban Oxford, where his attention turns to semi-detached houses he wonders what the neighbours reaction to the owner is. That owner is Caitlín Matthews, a shaman of the Celtic tradition, where she performs a healing on him. McCarthy moves outdoors to the West Country to speak with Robert John Stewart, who explains the tradition of faery in the British Isles, and whether he thinks they exist. He then meets Emma Restall Orr and Philip Shallcrass from the Order of Bards, Ovates and Druids, members of The Awen Camp. They take him to Wayland's Smithy to leave an offering to the ancestors. It is 26 June 1996, and England is playing Germany in the semi-finals of Euro 96. McCarthy, and the production team, are struggling to stay focused on the ceremony, but he succeeds and he is initiated into Druidry at Abbots Wood. His final stop is back at Glastonbury. There he meets a spiritual healer, Geoff Boltwood, who is known as Tareth. Boltwood succeeds in making oil appear in McCarthy's hands, and speaks to him about the purpose he claims he was given when he had a near death experience at age 6.
3	"Across the Sea to Isis"
In episode three, McCarthy travelled to Ireland to visit Clonegal Castle, the headquarters of the Fellowship of Isis, where he was initiated into the Druid Order of Dana. Staying in Ireland, he met with some people who feel a spiritual connection to the country, tries using dowsing rods and then met a group of Roman Catholic priests who believe in connecting to their Celtic pagan roots.
4	"Order and Chaos"

=== Series 3 (1998) ===
No.	Title
1	"Sun, Sea and Sects"
Pete McCarthy travels to Maui island in Hawaii.
2	"The Devils Songline"
Pete McCarthy travels to Gapuwiyak, in the Northern Territory of Australia, where he meets the Yolngu people and is invited to witness one of their rituals.
3	"A Grave Affair"
In this 40 minute special we travel with Pete McCarthy to New South Wales in Australia. There he meets Graeme Innis who leads him through a Re-earthing Rite of Initiation. The programme follows McCarthy as digs his own grave, and although it becomes obvious very quickly that Pete is beginning to have serious doubts about continuing he still goes ahead, and also continues to allow filming of the whole process. This programme is a credit to Pete McCarthy both as it shows his courage in the face of his overwhelming fears, and also that he would allow these to be shown on national television.
4	"Sacred Bull"
Pete McCarthy travels to the outskirts of San Francisco in USA where he visits the Isis Oasis in Geyserville. He then travels on to visit the Church of All Worlds, which is based on the church mentioned in the Robert Heinlein 1961 novel Stranger in a Strange Land.
5	"Greetings Star Children"
Pete McCarthy travels to Byron Bay in Australia.
6	"Aliens, Elves and God"
Pete McCarthy travels to Iceland to explore their belief in the Huldufólk.

== See also ==
- Pete McCarthy
