= Israeli Documentary Forum =

The Israeli Documentary Forum
- הפורום הדוקומנטרי בישראל
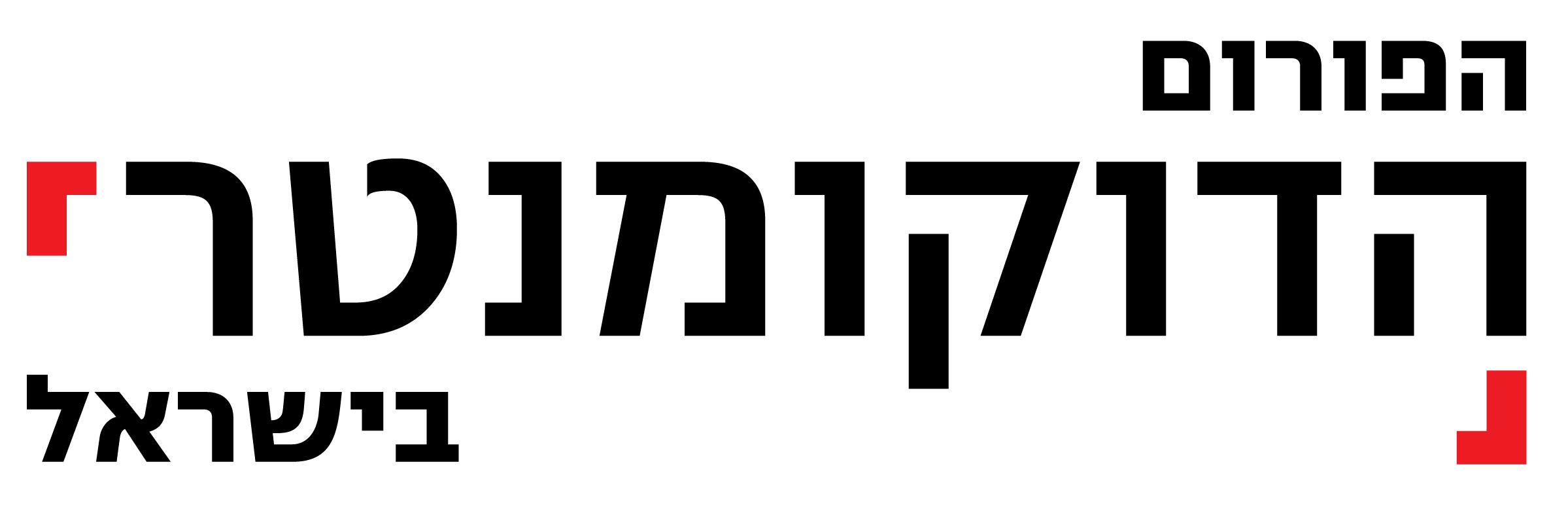
- Founded: 1995 in Tel Aviv, Israel
- Type: Nonprofit organization
- Members: 400+
- Chairman: Roni Aboulafia
- Website: www.fdoc.org.il

The Israeli Documentary Forum (Formerly The Israeli Documentary Filmmakers Forum) is an Israeli nonprofit organization that serves as an umbrella organization for documentary filmmakers in Israel. The forum has been instrumental in securing commercial and public funding for Israeli Documentary films and securing the rights of documentary filmmakers. It also regularly supports filmmakers who receive institutional scrutiny, censorship or banning.

== Goals ==
According to the Forum's website, the goals of the Forum are "to promote Israeli documentary filmmaking in Israel and around the world, to establish original documentary filmmaking as one of the foundations of Israeli culture and as an important means of representing and reflecting reality in Israel, to cultivate and encourage diverse audiences and turn them into loyal consumers of Israeli documentary works and to establish an association that will serve as a professional home for anyone involved in documentary filmmaking in Israel".

The forum's goals are described in greater detail in its original 1998 charter.

== Structure ==
The forum has more than 400 members from various fields of documentary filmmaking, including directors, producers, editors and researches.

The current chairperson of the forum is Roni Aboulafia

=== Chairpersons by year ===
Name	Term of office
Doron Tsabari	1998–2002
Yulie Cohen	2002–2004
Naftali Gliksberg	2004–2008
Avishai Kfir	2008–2010
Uri Rosenwaks	2010–2014
Osnat Trabelsi	2014–2019
Hagit Ben-Yaakov	2019–2024
Roni Aboulafia	2024–present

== Establishment ==
In 1995, a group of Israeli documentary filmmakers began holding weekly meetings to identify and map the challenges and needs facing documentary filmmakers in Israel. These discussions led to the decision to establish an association that would bring together documentary filmmakers and promote the field in Israel. A subsequent emergency conference at the Tel Aviv Cinematheque brought together more than 100 directors and producers. During the conference, The establishment of the association and the election of its first board were announced. In 1998, the Forum was formally registered as an association.

== Activities ==
Over the years, the forum has initiated and participated in various campaigns aimed at securing rights of documentary filmmakers in Israel, protecting freedom of expression, increasing public and commercial investment in Israeli documentary production, and ensuring that broadcasters comply with their regulatory obligations. The Forum has also participated in proceedings involving cultural regulators, including the appointment of members of the Israel Broadcasting Authority's governing body.

=== Notable campaigns ===
One of the Forum’s first campaigns in 1996, called for fairer prices for documentary films and urged broadcasters to meet their obligations to invest in original productions, mainly Noga Communications and its acquisition of documentary productions for Channel 8, owned by Noga. In 1996, Channel 8 was the only television channel in Israel devoted to documentary programming and so many filmmakers depended on it for employment.

Subsequently, The Forum was the first obtain the cable companies' performance report and claimed that it proves that companies did not provide detailed information about their financial investment in productions, that only a small fraction of the investment required by law was actually invested in documentary films and that the majority of the programming consisted of foreign documentaries.

The Forum also participated in a campaign that led to Israel’s first agreement establishing fair compensation for directors and screenwriters. A further campaign contributed to legislation requiring cable companies to invest 8%-12% of their revenues in original productions and establishing regulatory oversight of these obligations. In subsequent years, the Forum has continued to advocate for the preservation and enforcement of these investment requirements.

The forum has also participated in the long-running campaign against various Government Bills opting to close down or regulate public broadcasting in Israel.

In 2024, the forum joined opposition to a proposed reform of film funding promoted by Culture Minister Miki Zohar.

In September 2025, thousands of international filmmakers signed a joint statement pledging not to work with Israeli film institutions In response, the Forum issued a joint statement with the Directors Guild of Israel, stating that while a distinction should be made between filmmakers and their government, Israeli filmmakers bear responsibility for its policies and are effectively caught between a rock and a hard place: on the one hand, they face criticism from within Israel, while on the other, they are subjected to a boycott from abroad.

=== Defense of freedom of expression ===
In January 2003, the forum and Mohammad Bakri, director and producer of the documentary film Jenin, Jenin, petitioned the Supreme Court of Israel against the decision of the Israel Film and Play Review Board to prohibit the screening of the film under the Israeli Films Ordinance. Following the petition, the court ruled in November of that year that the film could be screened. In its reasoning, the court considered the appropriate balance between freedom of speech and harm to public sensibilities when the two values conflict. The ruling emphasized the importance of freedom of expression as a fundamental right in a democracy, holding that where freedom of expression conflicts with harm to public sensibilities, freedom of expression should prevail. In 2007, Forum chairperson Naftali Gliksberg submitted an affidavit in a defamation lawsuit concerning the film, defending the film and its production. In January 2021, the Central District Court prohibited the distribution and screening of the film in Israel. In response, Forum chairperson Hagit Ben-Yaakov defended the film and its production.

In July 2015, the Forum, together with other Israeli film and television guilds, condemned the decision of Beersheba mayor Ruvik Danilovich to cancel a screening of the film Shivering in Gaza, following the earlier cancellation of its screening in Sderot In the same year, the Forum also supported an initiative by filmmakers to hold a protest screening of the film To the Edge of Fear after the management of the Jerusalem Film Festival decided to screen it outside the festival's official program as it depicts the life of controversial assassin Yigal Amir

In January 2023, the forum approached Culture Minister Miki Zohar and offered to screen the film Two Kids a Day for his viewing following his attempt to withdraw funding granted to the film.

During 2024, Communications Minister Shlomo Karhi repeatedly attempted to prevent the broadcast of the documentary 1948: Remember, Remember Not by the Israeli Public Broadcasting Corporation. As a result, its broadcast was postponed several times. During November 2024, several screenings at cinematheques were also postponed after the Israel Film and Play Review Board prohibited the film's screening on the grounds that it had not been submitted for approval under the Israeli Films Ordinance. In response, the Forum and other film and television guilds called on the Board not to allow political considerations to influence its decisions and condemned the use of a mandatory ordinance dating back to Mandatory Palestine On 25 November 2024, the Board permitted the film to be screened, with an age restriction of 16 and over. In August 2025, it was reported that the film would be broadcast in two parts by the Israeli Public Broadcasting Corporation in September 2025. Karhi responded by sending a letter to the corporation's director-general demanding that the film be removed from the schedule and threatening to harm the corporation's budget under the Nakba Law. Several days later, the Forum and other film and television guilds issued a statement condemning the minister. The film was ultimately broadcast on Kan 11 and made available for free online viewing.

In October 2024, the Israel Police prevented a screening of the film Lyd at the Al-Saraya Theater in Jaffa, arguing that the film had not received approval from the Film and Play Review Board as required by the Israeli Films Ordinance. The police action followed an appeal by Culture Minister Miki Zohar. In response, the Forum and other film and television guilds appealed to Attorney General Gali Baharav-Miara, asking her to clarify to the minister that he lacked authority over the matter.

In March 2025, Zohar called on Israeli cultural institutions not to screen the film No Other Land, which concerns the struggle of Palestinians in the West Bank against evictions by the Israel Defense Forces. Following his appeal, the Forum sent a letter to cultural institutions calling on them to preserve the independence of Israeli cultural institutions and to screen the film and other works that encourage discussion and thought. In April of that year, a screening of the film at the University of Haifa was canceled following public pressure. The university reversed its decision the following day and approved the screening, while publishing a statement of support from the Forum.

In February 2026, the Forum, together with other Israeli film guilds condemned the decision of the Herzliya Cinematheque to cancel a screening of the film Beyond the Walls, accusing the cinematheque's management of yielding to pressure from right-wing activists.

== Israeli Documentary Film Awards ==
Since 2006, the Forum has annually presented the Israeli Documentary Awards for outstanding documentary filmmaking. During the ceremony, prizes totaling hundreds of thousands of Shekels are awarded to winners in various categories.

== Programs and initiatives ==
=== DocuStart ===
DocuStart is a development program for emerging documentary filmmakers in cooperation with the Gesher Multicultural Film Fund, initiated and led by filmmaker Nitzan Gilady. Through professional mentoring, workshops, and opportunities to present their work to industry professionals, participants develop early-stage ideas into projects ready for production and fundraising.

=== DocuClub and DocuTalk ===
DocuClub is a nationwide network of communities for documentary-film enthusiasts, established by the Forum, with a particular focus on Israel's social periphery. The initiative operates documentary film clubs that hold, on average, one screening per week of an Israeli documentary, accompanied by meetings with filmmakers. DocuTalk is a nationwide network of documentary film clubs for teenagers, also focusing on communities in the social periphery.

=== "Bars" project ===
Between 2020 and 2022, the Forum initiated the "Bars" Project, a program of documentary screenings and meetings with filmmakers in prisons throughout Israel, in cooperation with the Israel Prison Service. The project held approximately 50 screenings each year, all featuring Israeli documentaries, alongside meetings between prisoners and filmmakers.

=== Israeli Documentary Film Catalogue ===
The forum established and maintains the Israeli Documentary Film Catalogue, described as the largest documentary film database in Israel. The catalogue contains more than 1,000 films and series and enables users to contact their creators.

In 2020, during the COVID-19 pandemic, the forum made numerous documentary films available for free online viewing.
