= Circus Palestine =

- Film poster
- קרקס פלשתינה
- Directed by: Eyal Halfon
- Written by: Eyal Halfon
- Produced by: Anat Bikel; Uri Sabag; Haim Sharir; Yulie Cohen; Marek Rozenbaum
- Starring: Yoram Hattab; Jenya Dodina; Amos Lavi; Vladimir Friedman; Bassam Zuamut; Rinan Haim
- Cinematography: Valentin Belonogov
- Edited by: Tova Asher
- Music by: Shlomo Gronich
- Production companies: Paralite Films; Transfax Film Productions Ltd
- Distributed by: Sisu Home Entertainment
- Release date: 26 November 1998
- Running time: 83 minutes
- Country: Israel
- Language: Hebrew

Circus Palestine (Hebrew: קרקס פלשתינה, translit. Kirkas Palestina) is a 1998 Israeli political satire film directed by Eyal Halfon, which was nominated for seven Israeli Film Academy Awards, winning five.

The film allegorically discusses the relationships between Israelis and Palestinians and the Israeli-Arab conflict. It was selected as the Israeli entry for the Best Foreign Language Film at the 71st Academy Awards, but was not accepted as a nominee.

== Plot ==
A Russian circus arrives on the West Bank during the intifada. The war rages, the circus acts perform and a lion escapes in the middle of the night. An Israeli officer falls in love with the lion tamer and helps her search for it. They encounter the absurdities of life living under a military occupation. Though an unlikely plot, it was based on a true story.

== Cast ==
- Yoram Hattab as Shimshon Bleiberg
- Jenya Dodina as Marianna Stasenko
- Amos Lavi as Colonel Oz
- Vladimir Friedman as Circus Boss
- Bassam Zuamut as Ibrahim
- Rinan Haim as Lugassi

== Reception ==
Won 5 awards from the Israeli Film Academy Awards:

- Best Actor - Yoram Hattab
- Best Actor - Amos Lavi
- Best Film
- Best Music - Shlomo Gronich
- Best Screenplay - Eyal Halfon

== See also ==
- List of submissions to the 71st Academy Awards for Best Foreign Language Film
- List of Israeli submissions for the Academy Award for Best Foreign Language Film
