= Jacques Cohen (actor) =

Israeli actor (1930–2016)

- ז'אק כהן
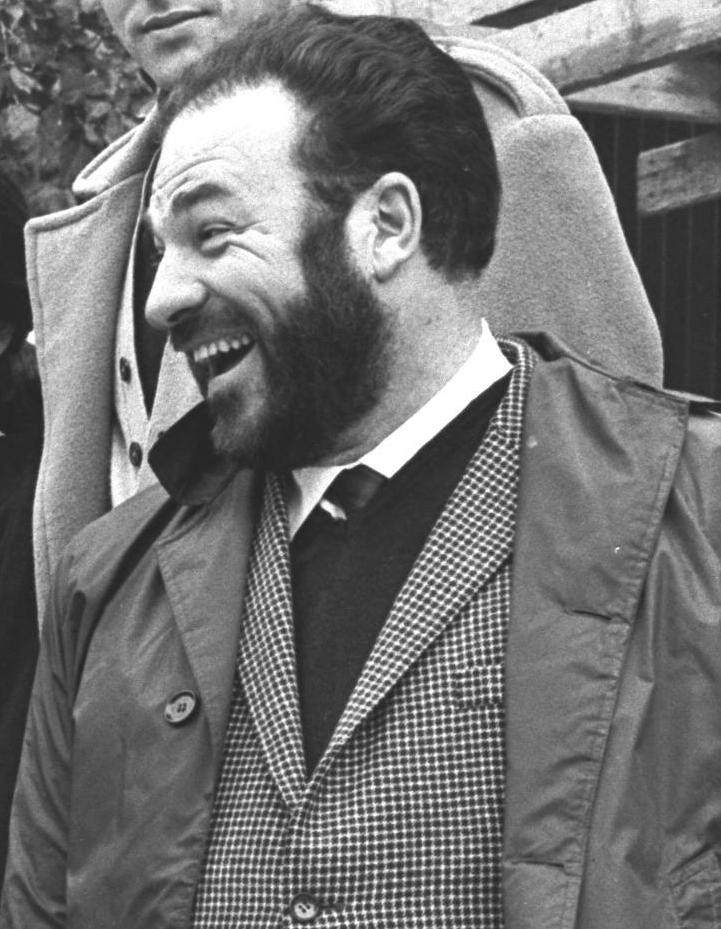
- Cohen in 1968
- Born: 13 October 1930; Alexandria, Egypt
- Died: 1 December 2016 (aged 86); Rehovot, Israel
- Occupation: Actor
- Years active: 1954–2006
- Children: 3

Jacques Cohen (Hebrew: ז'אק כהן; 13 October 1930 – 1 December 2016) was an Israeli actor.

== Biography ==
Cohen, who was born in Alexandria, Egypt, moved to Mandatory Palestine (present-day Israel) with his parents when he was just 5 years old. The family settled in Jerusalem, where Cohen became an actor during his 20s. Cohen first came to prominence with the amateur Circle Theater, in English, in Jerusalem, directed by Phillip Diskin. He played the lead in Jarry’s ‘Ubu Roi” for a year, 1965-1966. This was the first full length production to appear on the stage of the Tzavta Club in Tel-Aviv. He also performed the one-man play “Krapp’s Last Tape” by Samuel Beckett.

Cohen was best known for his starring role as Abu Rami, an Arab Israeli restaurant owner, on the sitcom HaMis'ada HaGdola, from 1985 until 1988. The show, which aired for three seasons, was created to appeal to both Jewish and non-Jewish television viewers in the surrounding region. Cohen, who was already an accomplished stage and television actor before HaMis'ada HaGdola, became so identified with his iconic role of Abu Rahmi that he later became a spokesperson for a major brand of hummus. Cohen spoke fluent Arabic and Hebrew, allowing him to play characters in both languages.

Cohen spoke Hebrew without an accent. The dialogue for his best known role as restaurateur Abu Rahmi on HaMis'ada HaGdola was mostly in Arabic, but also required lines in Hebrew, as well as other languages, including Japanese and Yiddish.

He played a Lebanese government minister in the 1986 American action film The Delta Force.

During the 2000s, Cohen opened his own restaurant in his hometown of Bitzaron.

== Death ==
Cohen died from complications of pneumonia at a hospital in Rehovot, on December 1, 2016, at the age of 86. His death was announced by the country's Minister of Culture and Sports, Miri Regev. Cohen, a resident of Bitzaron, was survived by his wife and three children.

== Partial filmography ==
- La mestiza (1956)
- Sayarim (1967)
- Aserei Hahofesh (1968) - Prisoner
- Le viol d'une jeune fille douce (1968) - Jacques
- Hasamba (1971) - Police Officer
- Harpatka'ot Yaldei Hahof (1971)
- Bloomfield (1971) - Ariana Proprietor
- Nurit (1972)
- The Jerusalem File (1972) - Altouli
- Chamsin (1972) - Itzik, Chauffeur
- Matana Mishamayim (1973)
- Rak Hayom (1976)
- Hamesh Ma'ot Elef Shahor (1977)
- Gonev Miganav Patoor (1977)
- Bo Nefotzetz Million (1977)
- Belfer (1978)
- Lo La'alot Yoter (1979)
- Ashanti (1979) - German at Slave Market
- Hanna K. (1983) - Man at airport
- Gesher Tzar Me'od (1985)
- The Delta Force (1986) - Lebanese Minister
- Every Time We Say Goodbye (1986) - Solomon
- The Impossible Spy (1987) - Assan
- Tel Aviv-Los Angeles (1988)
- Talveh Li Et Ishteha (1988) - Sheikh Abu Antar
- Summertime Blues: Lemon Popsicle VIII (1988) - Polly's Father
- Delta Force 3: The Killing Game (1991) - Anwar Mossach
- Tipat Mazal (1992) - Morris
- The Mummy Lives (1993) - Lord Maxton
- The Road to Glory (1997) - Marek the Manager
- Aviva Ahuvati (2006) - Dr. Zahrir (final film role)
