= Blair Colony =

The Blair Colony
- Ghost town
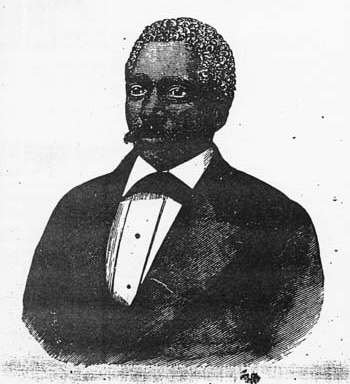
- Norvel Blair, a member of the family who founded the town, from his 1880 memoir

- Location within South Dakota Location within the United States
- Coordinates: 44°48′10″N 100°25′14″W
- Country: United States
- State: South Dakota
- County: Sully County
- Settled: 1883

The Blair Colony, also known as the Sully County Colored Colony, was a homestead community established by African-Americans in rural Sully County, South Dakota, United States. It was first established by the family of Norvel Blair in 1883. With the encouragement of the Blairs, dozens more African-American settlers moved to the area over time. During the Great Depression, most of the settlers moved away, and the community is now largely a ghost town.

== Establishment ==
In 1882, Norvel Blair of Morris, Illinois, sent two sons, Benjamin P. and Patrick Henry, to scout the Dakota Territory for land to establish a homestead. The Homestead Act of 1862 had allowed African-Americans and citizens of limited means to file for claims without needing to make a large investment upfront. Norvel Blair was a successful farmer and horse breeder, but decided to leave Illinois after being cheated out of his land by a white lawyer. Other African Americans had already begun moving to the area around Pierre earlier that year. Sully County was platted for homesteading and began accepting applications in 1883, and the Blair brothers filed claims in Fairbank Township, sections 13 and 14. Their father; mother, Mary; and other siblings joined them the following year. Eventually, seven Blairs would file and settle claims in Sully County.

The town of Fairbank itself, which had been established in October 1883, was abandoned by 1889 after being passed over by the Chicago and North Western Railway, but the Blairs were not affected, as their homesteads were strong enough to support themselves even with the loss of the town. The Blairs collectively ran a successful farming operation, as well as several other business ventures. Norvel bred Morgan horses he had brought with him to South Dakota; one of these horses, Johnny Bee, was deemed the fastest in South Dakota between 1907 and 1909. Benjamin and Patrick ran a livery out of Fairbank. Winnie and Betty Blair ran a restaurant and bakery in nearby Pierre, before they moved to Des Moines, Iowa, in 1909, where Betty became a realtor. Norvel, also an educator, went on to become the first Black South Dakotan to serve on a school board.

== Northwestern Homestead Movement ==
In 1906, Benjamin Blair traveled to Yankton, South Dakota, where he met with other African-American homesteaders to establish the Northwestern Homestead Movement. This group stated its mission as "bringing a better class of intelligent negroes from the southern states to South Dakota, to file on land in colonies and in the case of those having the means, to buy land outright". The movement aimed to establish colonies in Sully, Aurora, Lyman, Meade, and Stanley Counties, but only the Blair Colony lasted.

The Blairs personally encouraged African-Americans to move from the American South and East, themselves proposing to use 1,700 acres (2.7 sq mi) of their land for an agricultural college. Betty Blair in particular drove recruitment efforts, selling land from her realty business and traveling to Missouri to advertise the colony, reportedly convincing some settlers there were no flies in South Dakota. One prominent new family was the John and Ellen McGruder family from Bethel, Missouri, who purchased 1,200 acres (1.9 sq mi) from Betty Blair for $37,000. The McGruders kept 300 cattle, 3,000 sheep, and 30 horses. Other families included the Days, Figgins, and Joyners.

Over time, the Blair Colony became one of the highest concentrations of African-Americans in the state. Other families settled in neighboring Pearl and Grandview Townships. Although some families used the Homestead and Timber Culture Acts to finance their claims, many—including the McGruders—were wealthy enough to afford to buy the land outright. By the time of Norvel's death in 1916, 29 different African-American claimants had settled 5,170 acres (8.08 sq mi) in Sully County, 1,500 acres (2.3 sq mi) of which belonged to Blair family members. Church and community events were held in the old Fairbank schoolhouse. Norvel Blair established the Blair Cemetery in his lot; he, John McGruder, and several other community members are buried there.

Estimates of the total African-American population in the community vary between 80 and 200. According to decennial U.S. Census counts, Sully County was home to 7 Black people in 1890, 6 in 1900, 49 in 1910, 58 in 1920, and 48 in 1930. That year, Sully County accounted for 7.4% of South Dakota's Black population but only 0.6% of its white population. The Depression drove the number of Sully County Black residents down to 18 in the 1940 census and 0 by 1970.

== Decline and legacy ==
During the Great Depression and Dust Bowl, difficulties in farming the land caused most families to move away, looking for work in urban centers like Minneapolis–Saint Paul, Des Moines, Huron, and Pierre. By 1940, only 18, including the McGruders, remained in the community. By 2019, only a few McGruder descendants still live on part of their original homestead.

In 2020, the South Dakota State Historical Society placed a historical marker in nearby Onida, commemorating the existence of the colony and their contributions to development of the area.

== Bibliography ==
- Bernson, Sara L.; Eggers, Robert J. (1977). "Black People in South Dakota History" (PDF). South Dakota History. 7 (3): 241–270.
- Friefeld, Jacob K.; Eckstrom, Mikal Brotnov; Edwards, Richard (Winter 2019). "African American Homesteader "Colonies" in the Settling of the Great Plains" (PDF). Great Plains Quarterly. 39 (1): 11–37. doi:10.1353/gpq.2019.0001.
- Saxman, Michelle C. (2005). "To Better Oneself: Sully County's African-American "Colony"" (PDF). South Dakota History. 34 (4): 319–328.
