= They Came from Somewhere Else =

British TV sitcom (Channel 4, 1984)

- Written by: "Cliffhanger"
- Directed by: Jim Hill
- Starring: Robin Driscoll; Tony Haase; Pete McCarthy; Rebecca Stevens
- Country of origin: United Kingdom
- Original language: English
- No. of series: 1
- No. of episodes: 6

Production
- Producer: John Dale
- Running time: 25 minutes (approx.)
- Production company: Television South

Original release
- Network: Channel 4
- Release: 14 July – 18 August 1984

They Came From Somewhere Else is a British sitcom produced by TVS and broadcast on Channel 4 in the United Kingdom in 1984. It pastiches numerous horror films including Dawn of the Dead, Don't Look Now and Carrie.

The single series comprised six thirty-minute episodes starring Robin Driscoll, Rebecca Stevens, Pete McCarthy, and Tony Haase. The writing is credited to "Cliffhanger" and the series was developed from a 1982 theatrical production by Cliffhanger Theatre Company founded by Driscoll, Stevens and McCarthy and Martin McNicholas. The story is set in the fictional British new town of Middleford where Wendy, Colin and Martin are leading very dull, formulaic lives. The arrival of an American suffering from amnesia coincides with a series of increasingly bizarre events including a rain of liver, people getting sucked into drains, migraines so severe that they cause heads to explode, and zombies taking over the supermarket. The American observes that the town mysteriously contains no children.

Martin believes a strange, radioactive briefcase is behind the town's problems. The American has the key to the briefcase and he, Colin and Wendy open it and learn the truth of the situation: Middleford is a 21st-century rehabilitation prison located on a satellite orbiting Earth. The town's residents are all inmates who have had their memories and true personalities erased. Colin was the prison's designer but later rebelled against the evil nature of system and was sentenced there himself. The American is a pulp fiction writer who had been tasked with writing new personalities for the inmates until his wife, Wendy, was sentenced to 10 years imprisonment and he has now come to break her out. Unfortunately, his arrival has triggered a B-movie style doomsday scenario based on his book, The Night it Rained Liver, and the only way he can stop it and save Wendy from a grisly death is to sacrifice his own life. The series ends with Wendy making her escape, Colin being recaptured and forced to watch as his prison starts receiving child prisoners, and Martin promising retribution after regaining his own identity as a political activist.

The series has not been repeated since its original broadcast, nor released to home video or streaming services, possibly due to copyright issues arising from TVS's loss of its ITV franchise and subsequent sale.
