= Aidan MacCarthy =

Survivor of the atomic bombing of Nagasaki

Aidan MacCarthy OBE GM KSS
- Born: Joseph Aidan MacCarthy; 19 March 1913; Castletownbere, County Cork, Ireland
- Died: 11 October 1995 (aged 82); Northwood, London, UK
- Education: Clongowes Wood College University College Cork
- Spouse: Kathleen Wall (m. 1948)
- Children: 2
- Military career
- Allegiance: United Kingdom
- Branch: Royal Air Force
- Service years: 1939–1971
- Rank: Air Commodore
- Service number: 23425
- Conflicts: World War II
- Awards: Officer of the Order of the British Empire; George Medal
- Other work: Doctor

Air Commodore Joseph Aidan MacCarthy, OBE GM KSS (19 March 1913 – 11 October 1995) was an Irish medical doctor of the Royal Air Force and a prisoner of war to the Japanese during the Second World War. He survived the atomic bombing of Nagasaki in 1945.

== Early life ==
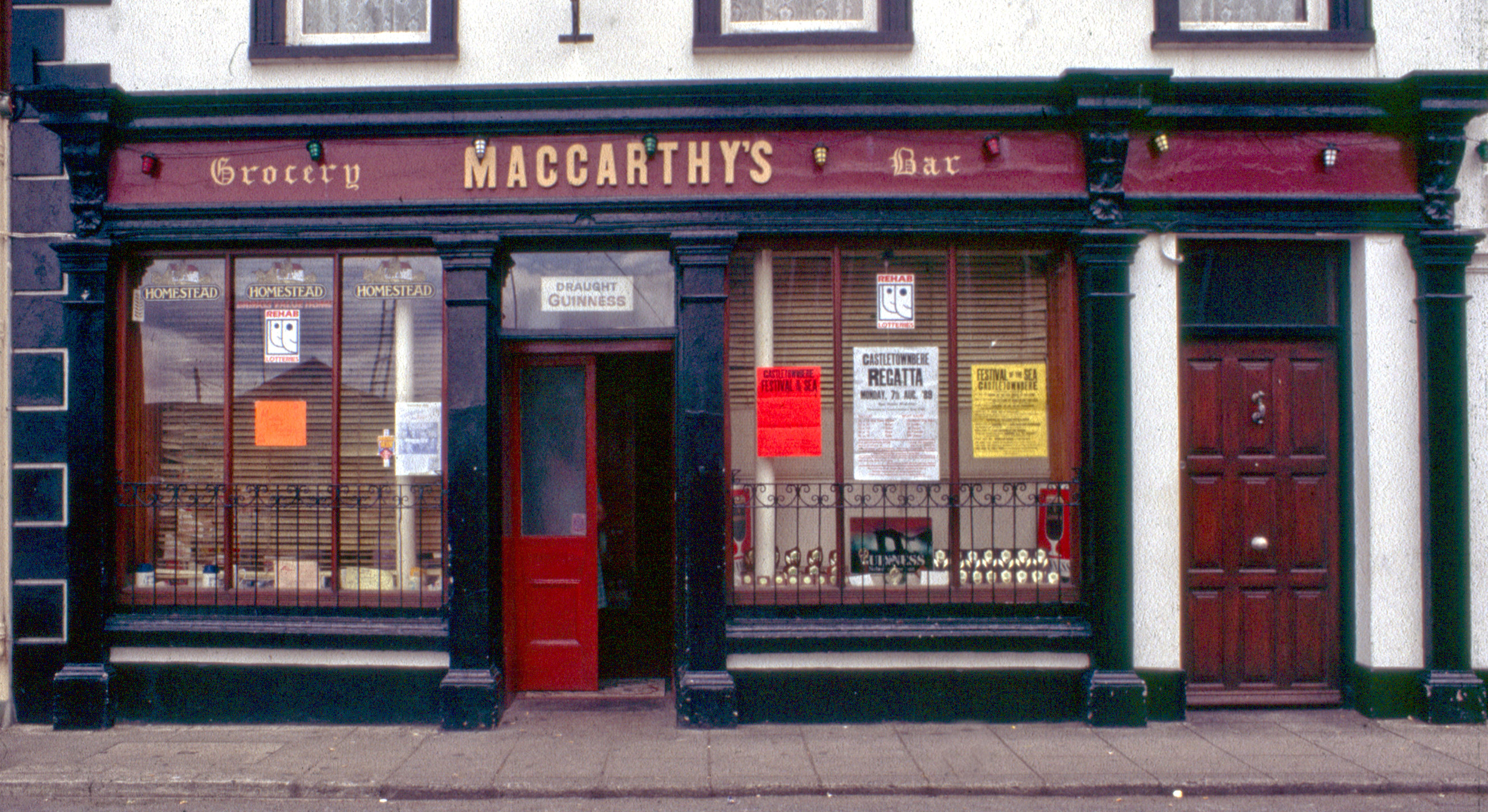
MacCarthy's Bar and Grocery (1989), where MacCarthy was born and spent his childhood

Aidan MacCarthy was born on 19 March 1913, in the town of Castletownbere on the Beara Peninsula, County Cork, Ireland, to Denis Florence MacCarthy and Julia (née Murphy). He was the sixth of ten children; he had four brothers and five sisters. He was raised in an apartment above the family business, MacCarthy's Bar, established by his grandfather, Michael McCarthy.

His parents owned land and businesses in the area. He was educated at a Dominican convent, then at Clongowes Wood College, where by his own admission, he applied himself more to sports than his studies, excelling at rugby, cricket, and water polo. Despite this, he narrowly achieved good enough grades to study medicine at University College Cork, where he continued his sporting activities; he was an accomplished swimmer and played as a blindside flanker for the university rugby team. After graduating in 1938, he was unable to obtain employment as a doctor in Ireland so he moved to the United Kingdom, working first in Cardiff, then in London.

It was there he met two of his old classmates from medical school and, after a night of drinking with them, decided to join the British Armed Forces as a medical officer. Which service (the Royal Navy or the Royal Air Force, the British Army having been ruled out earlier) was decided for him by a coin toss made by a nightclub hostess in the early hours of the morning.

== RAF career ==
In 1940, he was posted to France and was evacuated from Dunkirk where he attended wounded Allied soldiers while under fire from German aircraft. In September 1940, he was promoted to flight lieutenant.

The following year he was awarded the George Medal for his part in the rescue of the crew of a crashed and burning Wellington bomber at RAF Honington. The aircraft had crash landed after its undercarriage had failed to lower and it came to rest on the airfield's bomb dump, where it caught fire. Together with Group Captain John Astley Gray, MacCarthy entered the burning wreck and rescued two crewmen, but were unable to save the pilot. Gray was badly burned during the rescue; MacCarthy was also burned, but less seriously. Both men were awarded the GM.

Posted to the Far East in 1941, MacCarthy was captured by the Japanese in Sumatra. The ship Tamahoko Maru transporting Allied prisoners to Japan was sunk by a US submarine on 24 June 1944. MacCarthy had to do the best he could for his patients whilst splashing around in the South China Sea. After being initially rescued by a Japanese destroyer the crew then started to throw rescued prisoners overboard and the remaining prisoners on the destroyer jumped back into the sea and clambered back on the wreckage.

A Japanese fishing boat pulled him out of the sea and transported him to Japan. There, he cared for Allied prisoners of war who were forced to work in horrific conditions. To the Japanese ear, 'MacCarthy' and 'MacArthur' were indistinguishable. The Japanese assumed that MacCarthy must be a close blood relative of the American commander. Therefore, whenever MacCarthy answered his name, he was struck on the forehead. This likely contributed to his developing a brain tumour in later life. He was in charge of a working party in Nagasaki when the atomic bomb was dropped on that city on 9 August 1945. The prisoners had previously been warned, by secret radio, to take cover at a particular time of day without being given any further details. When the war ended, when some Australian ex-prisoners were attempting to lynch their Japanese captors, MacCarthy locked the Japanese guards in a cell and threw the key into the sea.

MacCarthy was the senior Allied serviceman in Japan at the surrender of Japan.

In 1946, MacCarthy was appointed an Officer of the Order of the British Empire. In 1948, he was promoted to the substantive rank of squadron leader, having held the rank of acting squadron leader since 1940. MacCarthy continued to serve in the RAF as a senior medical officer at bases overseas in Hong Kong, France, and Germany. Promoted to wing commander then group captain, he was serving as the officer commanding at the RAF hospital at Wegberg in Bavaria, when he collapsed from the effects of a brain tumour in 1969; he underwent an operation to remove the tumour in 1970.

MacCarthy retired from the RAF in 1971 with the rank of air commodore, the highest rank available to non-combatant officers. He continued to work for the RAF part-time as a civilian medical consultant until 1993, when he celebrated his 80th birthday.

== Personal life ==
In 1948, MacCarthy married Kathleen Wall, a nurse from County Galway whom he had met in post-war London. The couple had two daughters, Nicola "Niki" and Adrienne.

MacCarthy was a devout Catholic who cited his faith as instrumental in sustaining him through his wartime captivity in Japan. He was appointed a Knight of the Order of St. Sylvester for services to his church. He was dismayed by the Japanese Emperor Hirohito's state visit to the United Kingdom in October 1971 and by the decision of Buckingham Palace to reinstate the Emperor as an honorary Knight of the Garter.

Although MacCarthy did not talk about his wartime experiences for many years, after his collapse in 1969 he was encouraged to write about them in order to keep his brain active. This process proved therapeutic, and a friend encouraged him to complete his autobiography, which was published in 1979 as A Doctor's War. The book was republished in 2005.

== Death and legacy ==
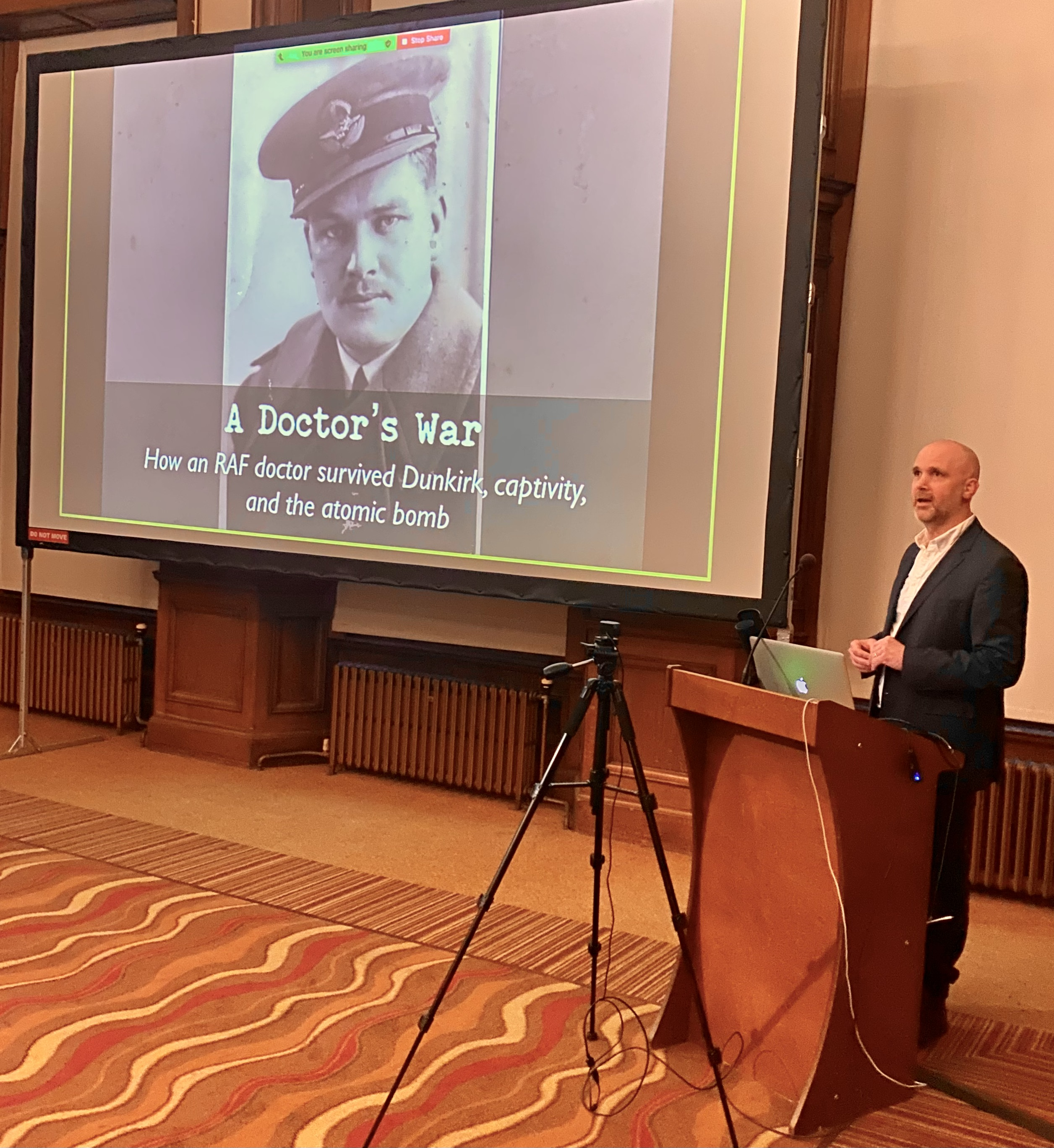
Bob Jackson: A Doctor's War

MacCarthy died in Northwood, north London, on 11 October 1995, aged 82, and was buried in his native Castletownbere. In 1990, RTÉ Radio had recorded an interview with him, the only occasion on which he spoke publicly about his wartime experiences. By coincidence, the broadcast of the interview was postponed for five years until the day of MacCarthy's funeral; in his honour, the mourners listened to the interview during the post-funeral lunch.

MacCarthy's Bar has become a tourist attraction and is run by his daughters. It houses the ceremonial sword gifted to him by Isao Kusuno, a Japanese officer during the War. A 2015 documentary film A Doctor's Sword, produced by Bob Jackson and directed by Gary Lennon, tells MacCarthy's story.

In July 2017, Prince Harry formally named a new RAF medical centre, the Aidan MacCarthy Medical Centre, at RAF Honington in his honour.
