= McCarthy's Bar =

2000 travel book

- First edition cover
- Author: Pete McCarthy
- Language: English
- Genre: Non-fiction
- Publication date: 2000

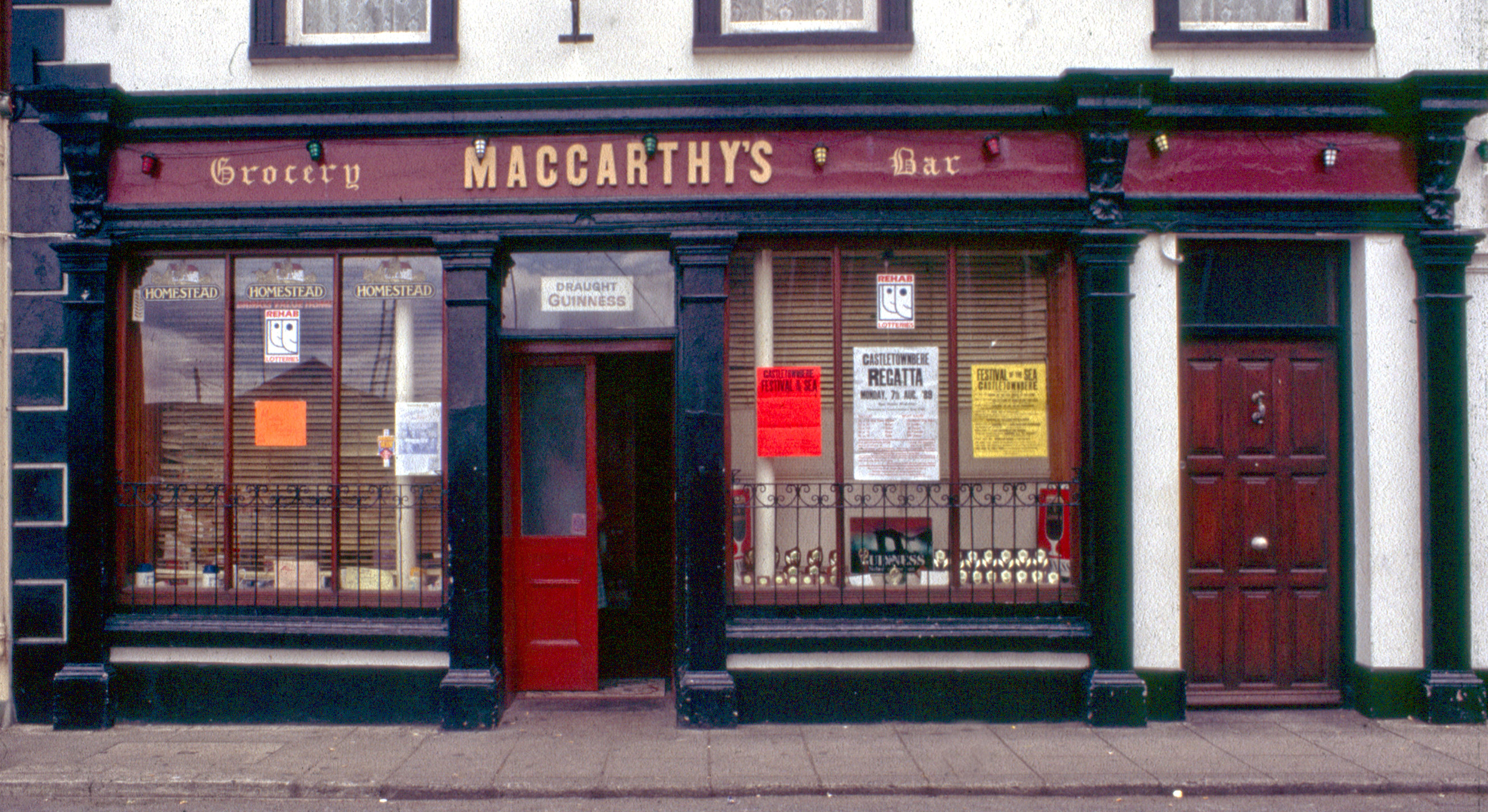
MacCarthy's Bar in 1989

McCarthy's Bar is the best-selling book by travel writer and comedian Pete McCarthy. First published in 2000, the book sold nearly a million copies leading to McCarthy winning Newcomer of the Year at the British Book Awards in 2002.

The book is often titled McCarthy's Bar: A Journey of Discovery in Ireland.

== Plot summary ==
The book describes a series of trips McCarthy makes to Ireland in the late 1990s exploring his past and family history, as well as documenting how Ireland is coping with changing realities.

== Publication ==
Its front cover features MacCarthy's Bar.
