= Yulie Cohen =

Israeli documentary filmmaker

Yulie Cohen יולי כהן
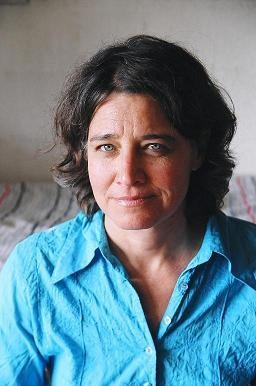
- Born: July 5, 1956 (age 69); Tzahala
- Other names: Yulie Gerstel, Yulie Cohen-Gerstel
- Occupations: Filmmaker, lecturer
- Notable work: My Terrorist
- Spouse: Moshe Gerstel (m. 1986; div. 2004)
- Partner: Adam Freedman

Yulie Cohen (in Hebrew: יולי כהן; born July 5, 1956) is an Israeli documentary filmmaker.

== Biography ==
Cohen was born in Tzahala, to Miki and Tami Cohen, the second of their three children. She is 6th-generation in Israel on her father's side, whose family came from Morocco and settled in Jaffa, and were among the founders of Neve Tzedek and the 66 originating families of Tel Aviv. Miki Cohen is a mechanical engineer, who made his career in the Ministry of Agriculture, became the CEO of Israel Shipyards, and founded the Palmach Museum. Her mother, Tami Cohen, is a member of Machsom Watch.

She began her university studies in Hebrew literature and international relations at the Hebrew University of Jerusalem, and then transferred to Tel Aviv University, where she completed her BA in sociology and anthropology, in 1982.

Cohen moved to the United States to continue her education, receiving her MA in communications with distinction from the New York Institute of Technology in 1985. During this time, she worked for the Israel Ministry of Defense delegation in New York.

In 1978, Cohen was working as a flight attendant for El Al, when she was injured in a terrorist attack in London, carried out by the Popular Front for the Liberation of Palestine (PFLP). Cohen was wounded by shrapnel in her arm; one of her colleagues, Irit Gidron, was killed. Cohen testified at the trial of Fahad Mihyi, who received four consecutive life sentences. Cohen suffered from extreme post-trauma and survivor guilt. 20 years later, she made a film about her journey of reconciliation with the man who shot her; My Terrorist became her most noted work, and won multiple awards.

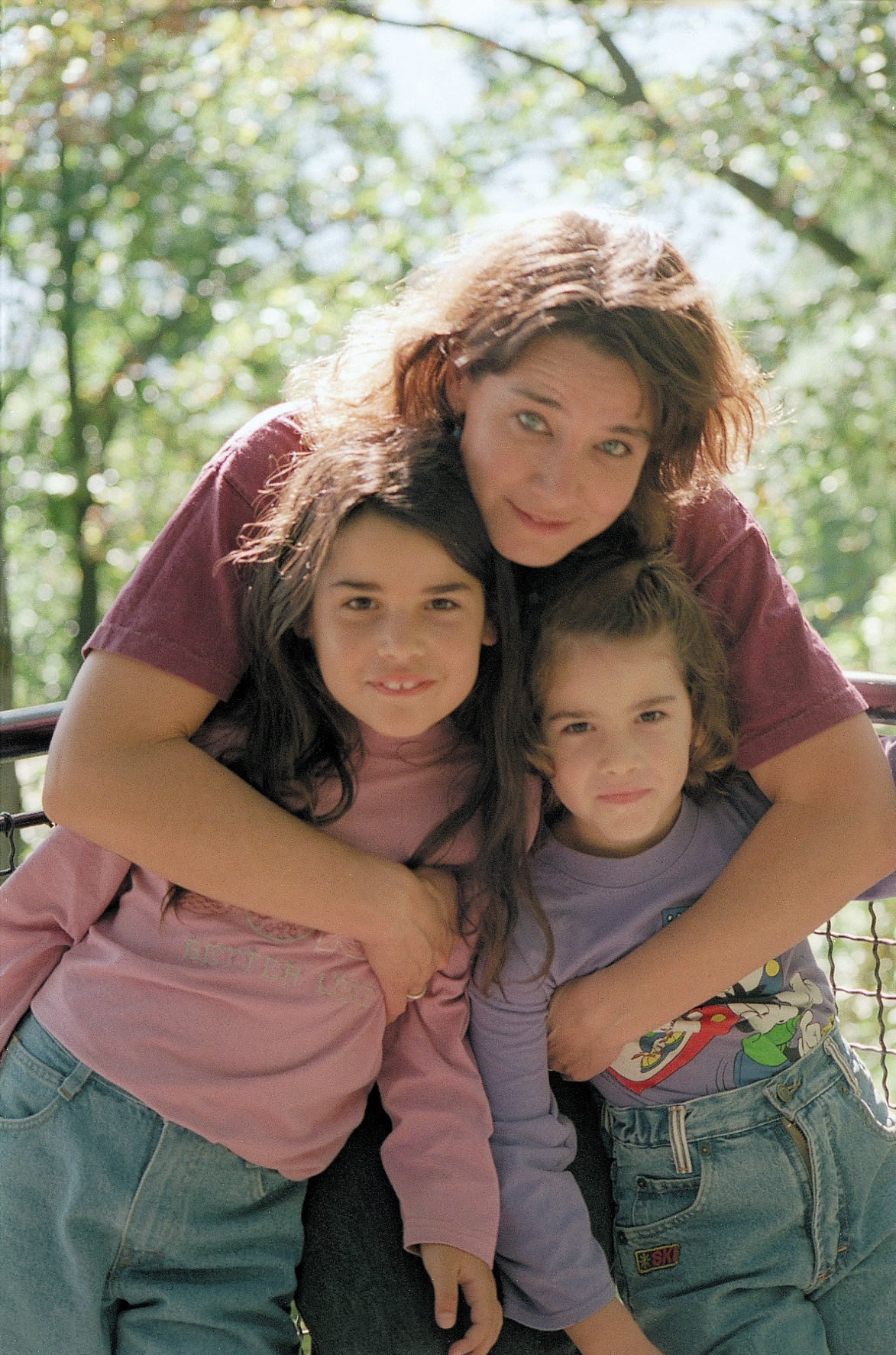
Still from the film ''My Terrorist'' (2002)

She then began working in the independent film industry, first in New York and then in Los Angeles. Her first job was as a production assistance and a driver, and then she moved on to script supervising, working on an independent feature, The Light in The Afternoon (1985), directed by Paul Williams and starring Karen Black. In New York, she worked with Israeli producer Yoram Mendel, first as a producer assistant and script supervisor and then as a post-production manager on the film The Big Blue, directed by Andrew Horn. She also worked with Hungarian director Péter Gothár on his film Just Like Amerika, and on a documentary film about Paul Newman.

Cohen married Moshe "Chico" Gerstel in 1986, in New York City. In 1988, when Cohen was pregnant with her first daughter, the couple decided to return to Israel and start their family there. Cohen taught a filmmaking course at WIZO Haifa Academy of Design and Education (1988–1991), and worked as an assistant director on Avraham Heffner's film, Ma Kara? (What Happened?). Her daughter Stav was born in the summer of 1988, and her second daughter, Sahar, was born in 1990.

In 2004, Cohen and Gerstel divorced. In 2006, she met her partner, psychotherapist Adam Freeman. They reside in Jaffa.

== Film career ==
In 1993, Cohen became an independent filmmaker. The first work she created was called Einayim Sheli (My Eyes), a series of short, 5-minute documentary films about children's hobbies from around Israel for the Second Authority for Television and Radio. The first documentary film she produced was about the moshav Patish, in the Negev, for Channel 2. It was directed by Yvonne Miklush. Between 1993 and 1995 Cohen produced five 30-minute documentary films for Channel 2, one of which, Hemdat Yamim, was her directorial debut.

In 1995, Cohen joined a group of journalists, including Rafi Reshef and Raudor Benziman, who submitted a bid for Radio Tel Aviv (102FM), and won. Benziman became the station's CEO, and Cohen the Vice President. Three years later, in 1998, Cohen sold her shares and left the station. That same year, she co-produced the Israeli political satire Circus Palestine, directed by Eyal Halfon. The film was nominated for seven Ophir Awards (the Israeli Academy awards), and won five, including Best Feature Film.

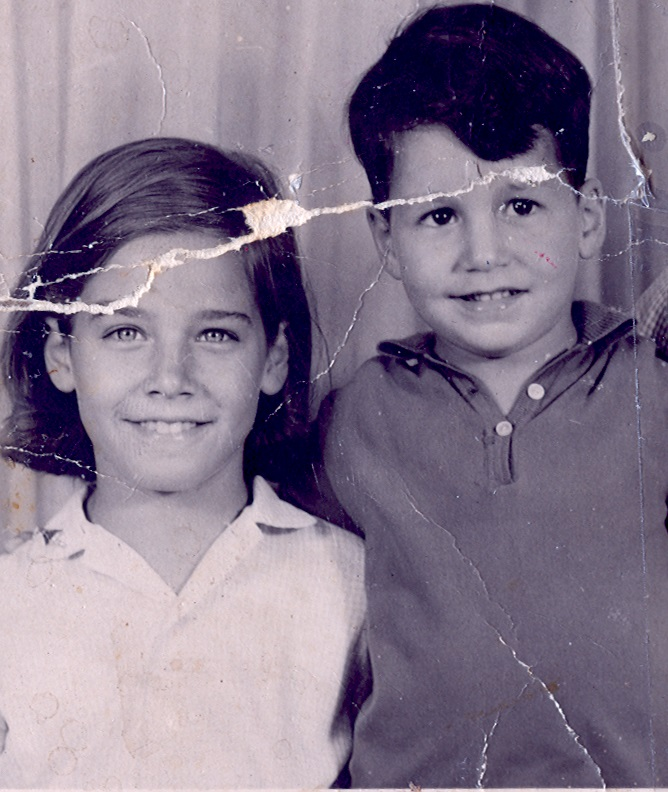
Photograph of Cohen and her estranged brother as children; from the film ''My Brother'' (2007)

In 1999 Cohen produced and directed Golden Cage, a 30-minute documentary featuring journalist Gideon Levy. The film is about a Palestinian expatriate in the Netherlands, who was detained by Israeli security forces after being accused of membership in the Popular Front for the Liberation of Palestine, and then deported. In 2000, Cohen was elected as chairperson of the Israeli Documentary Filmmakers Forum. In 2000–2001 she co-produced the full-length documentaries by Michal Aviad, Lev Ha'aretz (Ramla) for Channel 8.

In 1999, Cohen began working on her documentary My Terrorist, which premiered in 2002. It is the first in a trilogy of films, and describes her reconciliation process with Fahad Mihyi, the PFLP member who shot her in London in 1978. The film describes how Cohen started out as an avid patriot who wanted to become an officer during her military service, and became, after the shooting, an anxious mother who was afraid to let her daughters out by themselves, lest they become victims of a suicide terrorist attack. Nevertheless, years later, she felt compelled to reexamine Israel's history since her childhood in the 1960s, and came to some very different conclusions about the politics of her homeland. The film shows her efforts to secure Mihyi's release from prison as a political act, and her goal to stand up as a survivor and call for reconciliation on both sides.

My Terrorist won a special jury award at the Jerusalem Film Festival in 2002, was nominated for the Silver Wolf Award at IDFA, received the Provincia di Cuneo film award, and won the Ilaria Alpi Journalistic Television Award in 2004. It was broadcast in more than 20 countries, translated into 20 languages. Cohen went on a university speaking tour with the film, which included Harvard, Berkeley, and University of Chicago. The film was also on permanent display on the International Museum of Women in San Francisco website.

Her next film was My Land Zion (2004), the second in the trilogy. The film depicts Cohen's personal journey across Israel, through three generations of two families: Her parents, from the Palmach generation, and her daughters; Shula Golani, a Holocaust survivor, and her historian son, Motti Golani; and Ruti Gilis, who lives in the illegal settlement Karmei Tsur. The film premiered at the Rehovot International Women's Film Festival, and went on to screen at dozens of international festivals around the world. Yaron London said of My Land Zion: "This is a film worth seeing and then asking difficult questions... Many powerful scenes. It is a film about the cruelty of Zionism."

My Brother, the third installation of the trilogy, came out in 2007. It follows Cohen's attempts to reconcile with her brother, who became baal tshuva (adopting orthodox religion and lifestyle) in the 1980s, and lives in Bnei Brak, an extremely orthodox city, with his six children, and their children. Cohen and her brother have no contact. The film was funded by Reshet (Channel 2), and received high ratings upon broadcast. It also participated in the Haifa International Film Festival competition, and screened at cinematheque theaters around the country.

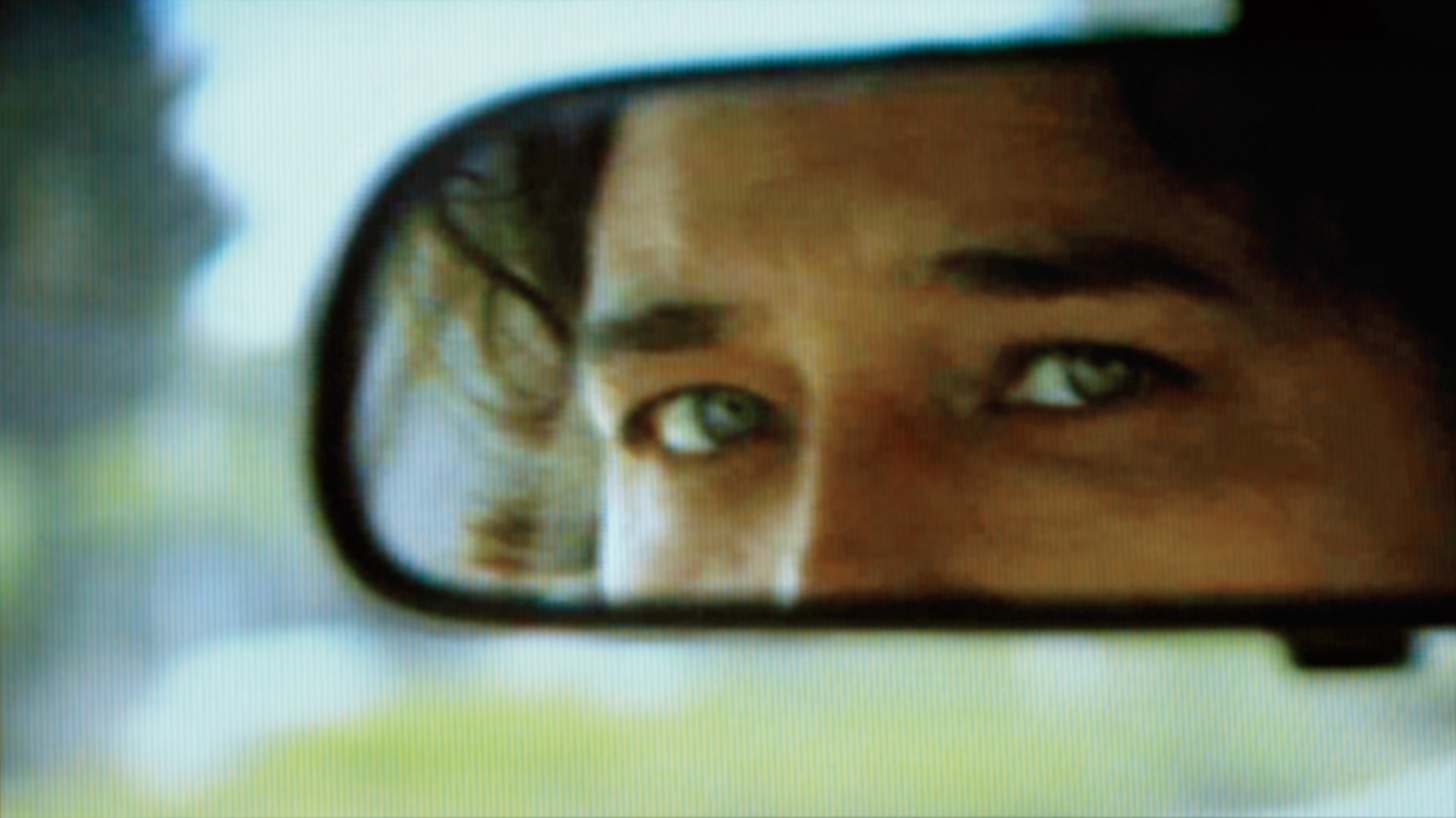
Still from the film ''My Land Zion'' (2004)

In 2007, Nick Fraser from the BBC asked Cohen to create a single film from the three parts of the trilogy. The result, My Israel, includes some new footage, and was broadcast on the BBC in 2008, in honor of 60 years from the establishment of Israel.

In 2009, Cohen's video art "Bibliography" was included in a group exhibition at the Suzanne Dellal Center. The piece was about her great grandfather, Yosef Eliyahu Chelouche.

A Minor Shrine For Our Love (30-minute documentary) was curated by Adi Englman in 2014 for Dani Karavan's exhibition 50 years of the Negev Monument in The Negev Museum of Art.

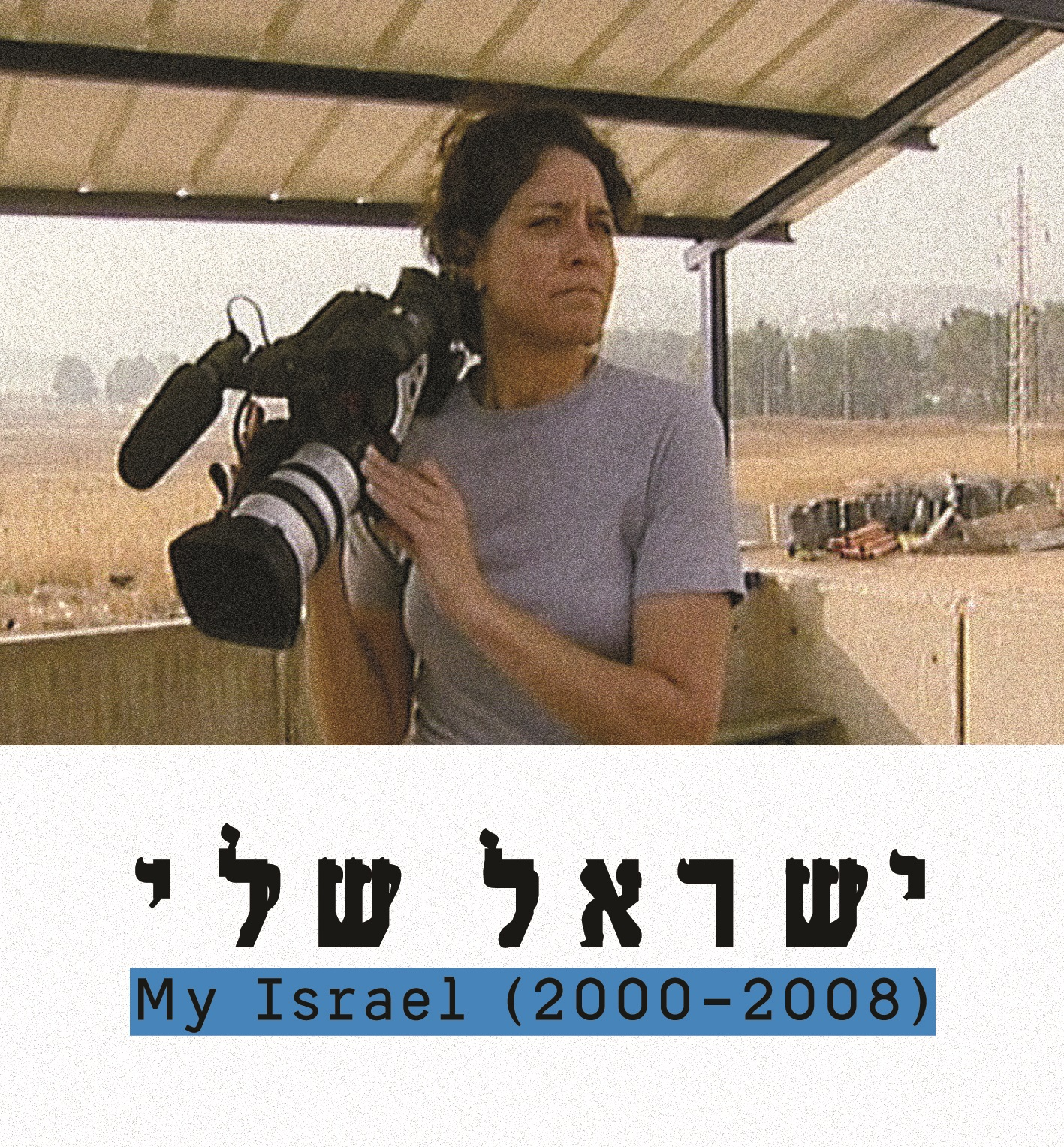
Image from the film ''My Israel" (2008)

== Academic career ==
Since 2009, Cohen has been teaching film and running workshops at Bezalel Academy of Arts and Design, as well as other film and art schools in Israel. Until 2013, she was the film-direction instructor in a multi-disciplinary documentary course at Bezalel, together with anthropologist Yona Weitz and cinematographer Micki Kratsman. During this period, she led two upper-level courses at the Haifa Academy of the Arts: A directing workshop and a project development class. Between 2013 and 2018 Cohen taught personal documentary filmmaking at the Maala Film School. She has also been teaching a course at the Arabic preparatory school of the Bezalel academy. As of 2018, She is the practicum instructor in Yona Weitz's pro-seminar "Me-story" at Bezalel, and also in 2018, began teaching the course "Personal Documentation" in the M.Des. degree department of visual communications at Bezalel. In 2020, Cohen won an award for excellence in teaching from Bezalel.

== Filmography ==
Year	Title	Role	Notes
1996	Hemdat Yamim	Producer, director, writer	TV documentary 30 min.
1999	Golden Cage	Producer, director, writer	TV documentary 30 min.
2001	Lev Haaretz (Ramla)	Co-producer	TV documentary 30 min.
2002	My Terrorist	Producer, director, writer	Documentary Trilogy, part 1
2004	My Land Zion	Producer, director, writer	Documentary Trilogy, part 2
2007	My Brother	Producer, director, writer	Documentary Trilogy, part 3
2008	My Israel	Producer, director, writer	Documentary Synthesis of Cohen's doc-trilogy
2014	A Minor Shrine For Our Love	Co-producer, director, writer	Documentary 50 years of Danny Caravan's environmental sculpture
2017	Our Natural Right	Director	TV documentary
2018	Who Killed Jessica – In development	Producer, director, writer	Animated film based on a true story
2019	Lo Omdot Mineged	Producer, director	PSA for anti-prostitution organization

== Video Art ==
- "Bibliography" – about Cohen's great-grandfather Yosef Eliyahu Chelouche
- "13.12.03" – created with Yonatan Vinitzky, exhibited at the Jerusalem Film Festival, 2004
- "Whither Thou Goest: Self-portrait" – DocAviv 2014

== See also ==
- List of female film and television directors
