= The Impossible Spy =

1987 film by Jim Goddard

The Impossible Spy is a 1987 television film based on the true story of an Israeli civilian spy, Eli Cohen, who was recruited into Israel's secret intelligence agency (the Mossad) in the 1960s to become a spy in Damascus. Prior to his capture in 1965, Cohen was about to be appointed the third-most powerful figure in Syria—the Deputy Minister of Defense. Cohen's memorization of Syria's individual gun placements along the Golan Heights enabled Israel to defeat Syria in the Six-Day War in 1967.

The film's executive producer was Harvey Chertok; it was directed by Jim Goddard and starred John Shea, Eli Wallach and Sasson Gabai.

The Impossible Spy was released in 1987 and won an HBO CableACE Award for Best Picture.

== Cast ==
- John Shea as Elie Cohen
- Eli Wallach as Yacov
- Sasson Gabai as General Haleb
- Michal Bat-Adam as Nadia Cohen
- Rami Danon as Avram
- Haim Girafi as Salloum
- Jacques Cohen as Assan
- Anat Barzilay as Galela
- Yossi Kenan as Nassim
- Judith Millo as Madame Massim
- Victor Kammar as Major Massim
- Shlomo Sadan as Syrian Colonel
- Wahabi Hasson as Egyptian Police Inspector
- Shmuel Shillo as Rabbi
- Ahouva Keren as Salloum's Girlfriend
- Hamdi El-Asmar as Hadj
