= Frits van Turenhout =

Dutch sports journalist (1913-2004)

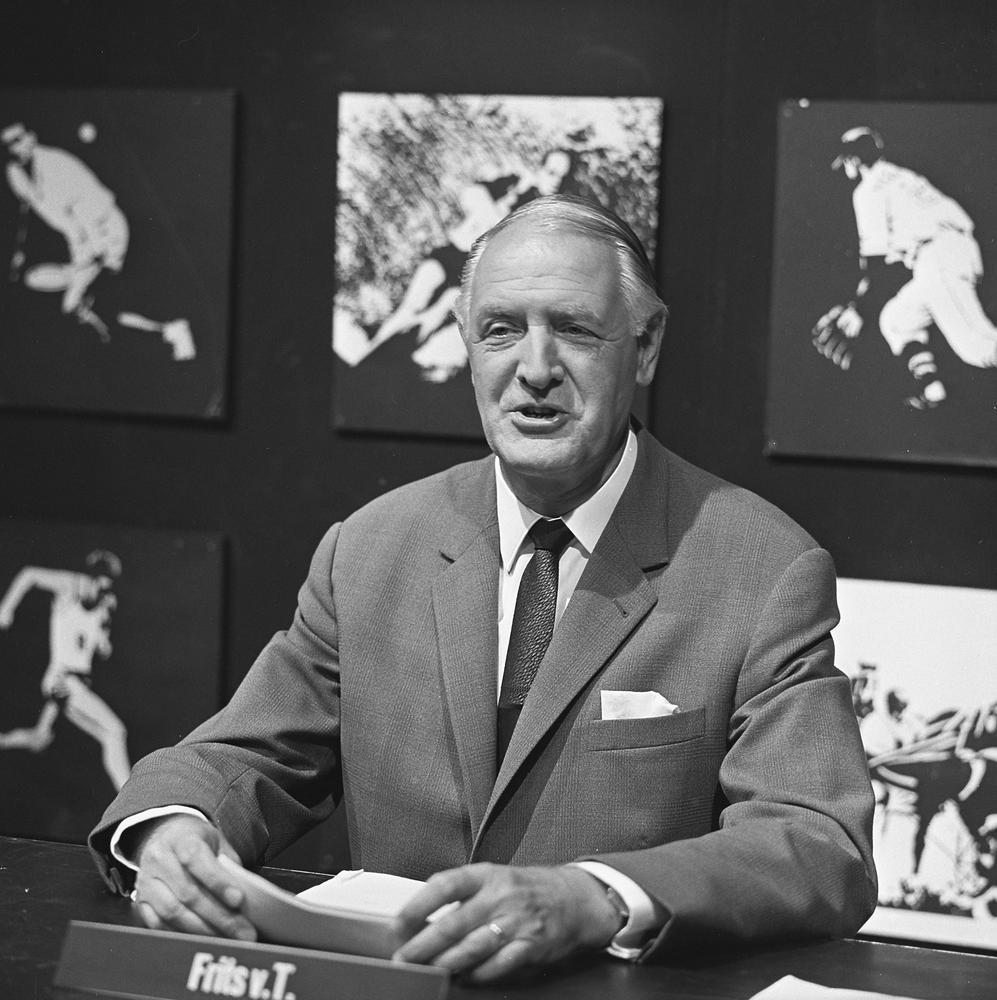
Frits van Turenhout in 1969

Frits van Turenhout (June 14, 1913 in Amsterdam – October 3, 2004 in Blaricum) was a Dutch sports journalist, appearing on both radio and television. He did this in a very solemn manner. He missed his own last broadcast due to an automobile accident he had on his way to the studio.
