= Olavi Laaksonen =

Finnish footballer (1921–2004)

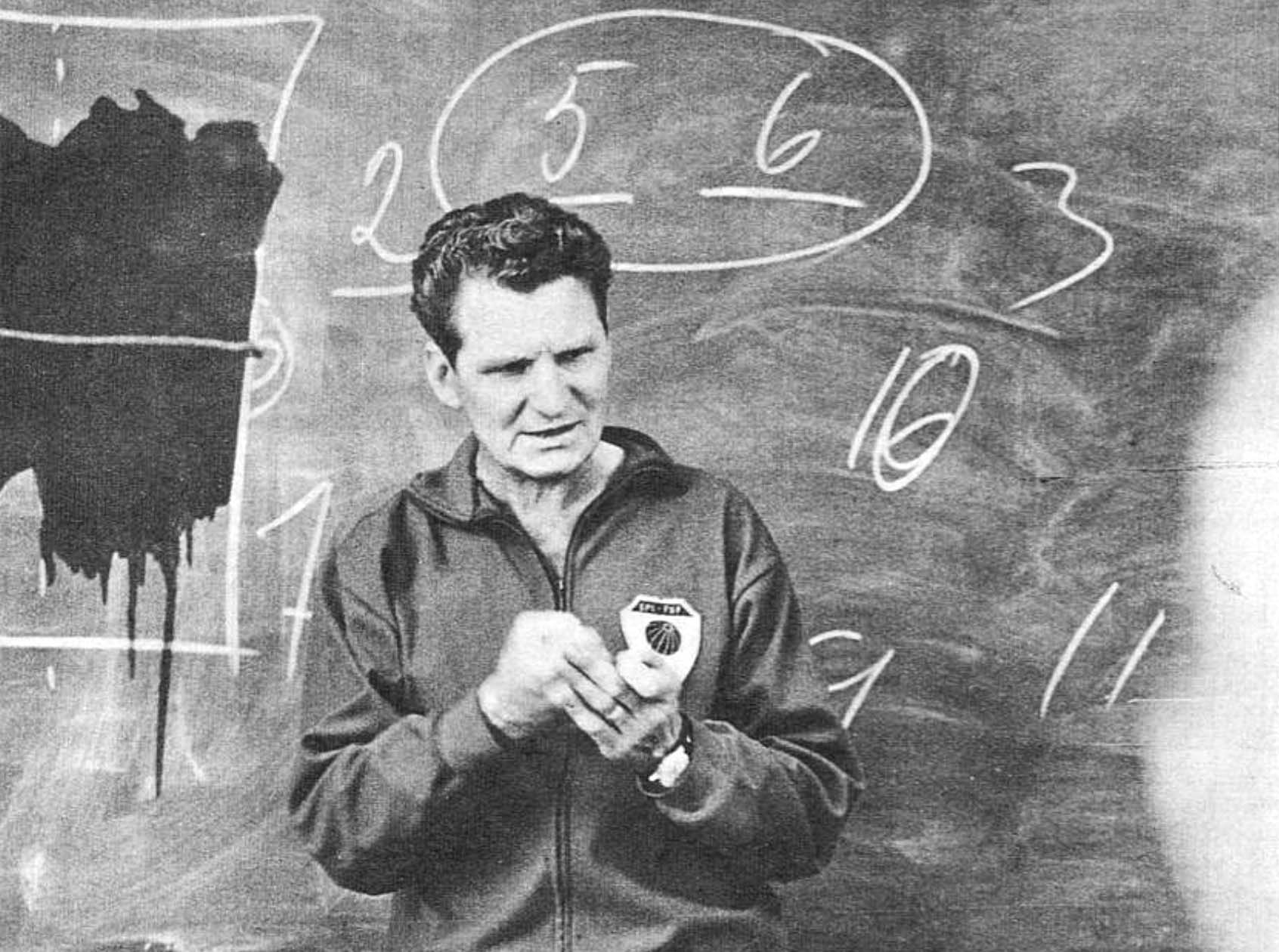
Photo of Olavi Laaksonen in 1963

Olavi Laaksonen (26 July 1921 – 27 October 2004) was a Finnish footballer who competed in the 1952 Summer Olympics.
