= Bassam Zuamut =

Israeli Arab actor (1951–2004)

- بسام زعمط
- Born: 27 March 1951; Jerusalem
- Died: 16 October 2004 (aged 53); Shuafat, Palestine
- Occupations: Actor; screenwriter
- Years active: 1976–2001
- Children: 1

Bassam Zuamut (Arabic: بسام زعمط, Hebrew: בסאם זועמוט; 27 March 1951 – 16 October 2004) was a Palestinian Israeli Arab actor and screenwriter.

== Biography ==
Zuamut was born in Jerusalem. He studied acting at Beth Rothschild.

Zuamut participated in many theater productions of the Jerusalem Khan Theatre, such as: "Antigone", "Measure for Measure" and "Abu Nimer stories" by Dahn Ben-Amotz. He also took part in the Al Qasba theater productions, such as: "Romeo and Juliet" and "The Marriage of Figaro". At Beit Lessin Theater he appeared in "A Trumpet in the Wadi".

He was best known for his role as Hakim the Chef on the Israeli sitcom HaMis'ada HaGdola.

== Death ==
Zuamut died on October 16, 2004, in Shuafat as a result of a severe kidney ailment. He was 53 years old.

== Filmography ==
=== Cinema ===
Actor

- 1979: Imi Hageneralit - Egyptian guard
- 1991: Gmar Gavia - Abu Eyash
- 1993: The Seventh Coin - Turkish Bath Attendant
- 1996: Haifa - Watermelon salesman
- 1998: Zirkus Palestina - Ibrahim Dayan (final film role)

=== Television ===
Actor

- 1979-1982: Stories by Halil - Halil
- 1985-1988: HaMis'ada HaGdola - Hakim
- 1989-1992: Neighbors - Bassam Maudar
- 2000-2001: De-Lux Family - Abu Osama

=== Screenwriter ===
- 2000-2001: De-Lux Family

== See also ==
- Theater of Israel
- Israeli television
