= Ted Blakey =

American historian and businessman (1925–2004

- Born: Theodore Robert Blakey; August 31, 1925; Yankton, South Dakota, U.S.
- Died: October 14, 2004 (aged 79); Yankton, South Dakota
- Burial place: Garden of Memories Cemetery, Yankton, South Dakota
- Spouses: Dorothy Edwards (m. 1948; died 1981) Chessie Wheeler (after 1991)

Theodore Robert Blakey (August 31, 1925 – October 14, 2004) was an American historian, businessman, and activist. He was instrumental in the civil rights movement in South Dakota and was leader of the committee that helped the state ratify the Twenty-fourth Amendment to the United States Constitution. Blakey was among the first African American leaders of Junior Chamber International, Kiwanis, and the Independent Order of Odd Fellows. He was named the state's black historian in 1995 and was inducted into the South Dakota Hall of Fame in 1997.

== Early life ==
Theodore Robert Blakey was born in Yankton, South Dakota, on August 31, 1925. His parents were Henry Blakey and Mary Fristoe, and Ted had ten older siblings. His parents had migrated from Missouri to South Dakota in 1905. He attended Grove Elementary School and earned his general education diploma in 1967.

== Career ==
Blakey founded his first business, Blakey's Janitor Service, in 1956 and expanded into a pest control business in 1968. He created Ted Blakey Bail Bonds in 1975.

Blakey was active in several social organizations. He served as president of the local parent teacher association and school board. He was a member of Junior Chamber International and became the organization's first African-American senator in 1965. He became president of a local Kiwanis chapter in 1971, becoming one of the first African Americans to do so. In 1998, he was appointed the grandmaster of the South Dakota Chapter of the Independent Order of Odd Fellows, making him the first African-American leader of any state lodge.

== Political career ==
Blakey was a Republican and served as a delegate to several state and national Republican conventions. Governor Archie Gubbrud appointed him commissioner of South Dakota's Emancipation Proclamation Committee in 1963, overseeing the state's passage of the Twenty-fourth Amendment to the United States Constitution, which eliminated the poll tax.

In 1969, Governor Frank Farrar appointed Blakey to the State Human Relations Commission, which had been formed the previous year to address civil rights issues in South Dakota.

In 1995, Governor Bill Janklow appointed Blakey as the state's black historian.

== Personal life ==
Blakey married Dorothy Edwards on October 22, 1948, in Athabasca, Alberta, Canada. Following her death in 1981, he married Chessie Wheeler on March 29, 1991; she died in 2000. He was a member of Yankton's historical African Methodist Episcopal Church and advocated for its restoration in the 1980s.

== Awards and honors ==
Blakey was inducted into the South Dakota Hall of Fame in 1997. He was featured in an episode of "Dakota Life" for South Dakota Public Broadcasting in 2001.

== Death ==
Blakey died in Yankton on October 14, 2004. He was buried on October 18 at the Garden of Memories Cemetery in Yankton.

== See also ==
- African Americans in South Dakota
