= HaMis'ada HaGdola =

- Opening caption
- המסעדה הגדולה
- Genre: Sitcom
- Created by: Joseph Barel; Eli Sagi
- Starring: Jacques Cohen; Marlene Bajali; Bassam Zuamut; Gassan Abbas; Halil Halladi; Na'im Khakim
- Country of origin: Israel
- No. of seasons: 3
- No. of episodes: 39

Production
- Running time: 30 minutes
- Production company: Israel Broadcasting Authority (IBA)

Original release
- Network: Channel 1 (IBA)
- Release: 1985 – 1988

HaMis'ada HaGdola (Hebrew: המסעדה הגדולה, lit. The Big Restaurant, Arabic: مطعم أبو رامي, Mat'am Abu Rahmi, lit. Abu Rahmi's Restaurant) was an Israeli sitcom, produced by the Arabic department of Channel 1, running between 1985–1988, every Shabbat evening. The series had great success both in Israel and in neighbouring countries like Cyprus, Turkey and in the Arab World. During its original run, it was considered the most popular Israeli TV show, both in Israel and the Arab World.

== Production ==
Joseph Barel, the Egyptian-born director of Arabic-language news for Israel Television (IBA), and later Channel 1 TV, conceived the original idea for the show. Barel wanted a sitcom format which would appeal to both Jews and non-Jewish viewers in the region.

The first twelve episodes were directed by the producer/screenwriter Eli Sagi, along with director Avi Amber. After these two retired from the production of the show, the rest of the episodes were directed by Antoine Salah and Victor Kahmar.

The sitcom-series depicted events in a Middle Eastern restaurant in Jerusalem, owned by an Arab-Israeli restaurateur named Abu-Rahmi (Jacques Cohen), and his wife Umm Rahmi (Marlene Bajali), and employing a funny chef - Hakim (Bassam Zuamat), a charming and charismatic waiter - Abdu (Gassan Abbas), a tongueless waiter named Ma'aruf (Halil Halladi), and a cross-eyed dustman called Artin (Na'im Khakim).

Jewish-Israeli guest stars appeared as diners at the restaurant, among them Sefi Rivlin (as a burglar), Tzipi Shavit (as a suicidal character who refuses to follow a diet), Gadi Yagil, and many others. Jacques Cohen eventually left the show following a dispute within the production, and the fictional restaurant was henceforth run by his wife and the chef.

The sitcom gained popularity among the Arab viewers outside Israel. Reruns continue to be broadcast, mainly during Ramadan, on IBA's channel Channel 33.

A spin-off theatrical play, "A wedding at the Big Restaurant" (Hebrew: חתונה במסעדה הגדולה), was produced in 1988, created by Eli Sagi and featuring the original cast. The audience was "seated" at the restaurant, and watched the behind-the-scenes events. According to Sagi, "The play was a huge success - a box office hit".

In 2009, the show's stars participated in a series of TV ads for Tzabar Salads, an Israeli food company that sells Middle Eastern style salads and sauces. Jacques Cohen was the presenter, and Gassan Abbas and Halil Halladi also took part. The late Bassam Zuamat was replaced by Lutf Abbas.

== See also ==
- Television in Israel
- Culture of Israel
