= The Barefoot Doctor =

British Taoist practitioner (1954–2020)

Stephen Russell
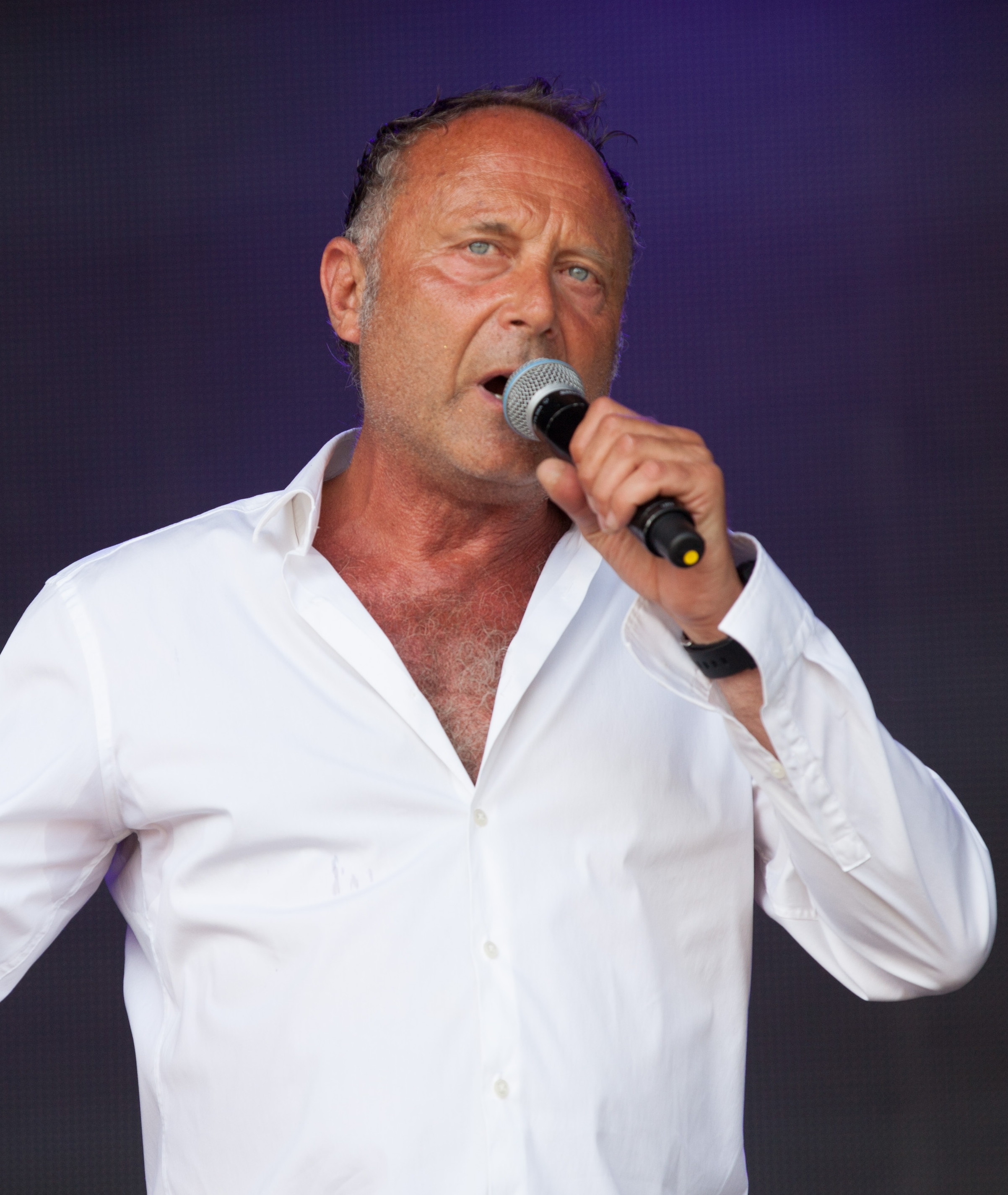
- Died: January 24, 2020
- Other name: The Barefoot Doctor

Stephen Russell, who wrote under the pseudonym The Barefoot Doctor, was a practitioner and teacher of Taoism.

== Work and teaching ==
Stephen Russell grew up in Hampstead, an area in London. On leaving full-time education Russell started to travel extensively and began to deepen his study of Taoism. He returned to London in 1983 where he ran an acupuncture practice for 17 years, as well as facilitating self-help workshops. Some of his clients included celebrities such as Madonna.

He wrote twenty one books, including Barefoot Doctor's Handbook for the Urban Warrior, A Spiritual Survival Guide and Pure: A Path to Peace, Power and Prosperity.

Russell was a weekly columnist for The Observer for five years.

In addition to giving talks, leading workshops and commenting on holistic and spiritual matters, he made a series for BBC UK Style named "Barefoot Doctor" which was broadcast in 2003.

=== Controversies ===
Mainstream medical professionals have criticised the advice given in Russell's popular Observer column as being founded on traditional beliefs rather than science, and his books have been described as "health fiction". He was accused of "sexually predatory" behaviour by several women. Jonathan Coe of medical practitioners' standards charity Witness, said that they had received five complaints about Russell relating to patients in treatment. Russell admitted to having sex with ex-patients.

== Selected bibliography ==
- Russell, S and Jurgen Kolb (1992) "The Tao of Sexual Massage" : Gaia Books
- Russell, S. (1998) Barefoot Doctor's Handbook for the Urban Warrior : Piatkus : London
- Russell, S. (1999) Barefoot Doctor's Guide to the Tao: A Spiritual Handbook for the Urban Warrior : Three Rivers Press : London
- Russell, S. (1999) Barefoot Doctor's Handbook For Heroes : Piatkus : London
- Russell, S. (2000) Barefoot Doctor's Handbook For Modern Lovers : A Spiritual Guide to Truly Rude and Amazing Love and Sex: Piatkus : London
- Russell, S. (2001) Barefoot Doctor's Handbook for Modern Lovers: A Spiritual Guide to Truly Rude and Amazing Love and Sex : Broadway : New York
- Russell, S. (2001) Return Of The Urban Warrior : Element Books
- Russell, S. (2002) Liberation : Element Books
- Russell, S. (2003) Twisted Fables For Twisted Minds : Element Books
- Russell, S. (2004) Instant Enlightenment : Element Books: London
- Russell, S. (2005) Manifesto London: Element Books
- Russell, S. (2005) Dear Barefoot: The Wisdom of the Barefoot Doctor Atlantic Books: London
- Russell, S. (2006) Invincibility Training : Element Books
- Russell, S. (2008) Pure : Hay House
- Russell, S. (2009) The Man Who Drove With His Eyes Closed : Hay House
- Russell, S. (2009) Jewels of Enlightenment : Nightingale Conant
- Russell, S. (2010) Supercharged Taoist: An Amazing True Story to Inspire You on Your Own Adventure " : Hay House
- Russell, S, (2012) The Message, vision for a new golden era : Imago
