= Waldir Villas Boas =

Brazilian footballer (1925–2004)

Waldir
Personal information
- Full name: Waldir Villas Boas
- Date of birth: 3 June 1925
- Place of birth: Rio de Janeiro, Brazil
- Date of death: 17 October 2004 (aged 79)
- Position: Defender

Senior career*
Years	Team	Apps	(Gls)
1949–1950	Flamengo	20	(0)
1951	Fluminense	37	(4)
1952–1953	Bonsucesso		
1953–1955	São Cristóvão		

International career
1952	Brazil Olympic	3	(0)
- * Club domestic league appearances and goals

Waldir Villas Boas (3 June 1925 – 17 October 2004) was a Brazilian footballer who competed in the 1952 Summer Olympics. He died on 17 October 2004, at the age of 79.
