= Richard Edwards (professor) =

American economist and author

Richard Edwards is an American economist and author. He served as the Senior Vice Chancellor for Academic Affairs director of Center for Great Plains Studies at the University of Nebraska–Lincoln, where he is now an emeritus professor. He had previously served as the dean of Arts and Sciences at the University of Kentucky. A study published in 1989 ranked Edwards as one of the 100 most cited economists in the United States

== Education ==
Edwards received his BA in economics from Grinnell College. Later, he received his PhD from Harvard University. In 1979 Edwards published the book Contested Terrain: The Transformation of the Workplace in the Twentieth Century, which emerged from his dissertation research. In a review of the book published in the journal Organizational Studies, the work was described as "a contribution to understanding the social relations of production in their own right." Another review published in Social Science Quarterly wrote that the book offered "a salient explanation of the evolution of management and job structures over the last 150 years."

== Career ==
Early in his career he held positions at the Harvard Graduate School of Education. Edwards served as the chair of the economics department at the University of Massachusetts-Amherst, teaching at the faculty from 1974 to 1991. From 1977 to 1978 he was a Fellow in Social Science at the Institute for Advanced Study of Princeton University. He later moved to the University of Kentucky, where he became the dean of Arts and Sciences. He then moved to the University of Nebraska–Lincoln to become the school's Senior Vice Chancellor for Academic Affairs, as well as serve as a professor of economics. During this time Edwards led the team that founded the Jeffrey S. Raikes School of Computer Science and Management. In November 2011 Edwards was named the director of Center for Great Plains Studies at Nebraska, where he is now professor emeritus.

== Research ==
In 1982 Edwards co-authored the book Segmented Work, Divided Workers. A review of the work stated that "The development of segmentation theory has reached its highest level with the publication of this work." In a review of his 1985 co-authored textbook Understanding Capitalism: Competition, Command, and Change, stated that the authors evoked a "real-world capitalism" that differed from their contemporaries. From 1987 to 1988 he held the German Marshall Fund Research Fellowship.

A study published in 1989 ranked Edwards as one of the 100 most cited economists in the United States. A review of his 1993 book Rights at Work: Employment Relations in the Post-Union Era, commented that the book highlighted the coming shift away from union-driven industries in the US and the need to plan for the consolidation of worker's rights in the absence of large-scale union organizing. Edwards' work has received honors including the Leslie Hewes Award. He is one of the leaders of the Homestead Records Project, a consortium of institutions including the University of Nebraska–Lincoln, Homestead National Monument, the National Archives and Records Administration, and several private firms.

In 2013 Edwards contributed an essay to a Congressional volume prepared for the inauguration of President Barack Obama. In 2015 he published the book Natives of a Dry Place: Stories of Dakota Before the Oil Boom, and in 2017 he was one of six authors on the book Atlas of Nebraska. That year he also published the book Homesteading the Plains: Toward a New History. In 2023 Edwards' released his book First Migrants: How Black Homesteaders' quest for land and freedom heralded America's Great Migration, the result of a five-year research project into black homesteaders in the American mid-west.

== Publications ==
- Contested Terrain: The Transformation of the Workplace in the Twentieth Century (1979)
- Segmented Work, Divided Workers (1982)
- Understanding Capitalism: Competition, Command, and Change (1985)
- Rights at Work: Employment Relations in the Post-Union Era (1993)
- Natives of a Dry Place: Stories of Dakota Before the Oil Boom (2015)
- Atlas of Nebraska (2017)
- Homesteading the Plains: Toward a New History (2017)
- First Migrants: How Black Homesteaders' quest for land and freedom heralded America's Great Migration (2023)
