= Pete McCarthy =

Irish comedian, radio & TV presenter & travel writer (1951-2004)

- Publicity photograph for McCarthy's Hangover show
- Born: Peter Charles McCarthy Robinson; 9 November 1951; Warrington, Lancashire, England
- Died: 6 October 2004 (aged 52); Brighton, East Sussex, England.
- Occupations: Comedian; broadcaster; travel writer

Peter Charles McCarthy Robinson (9 November 1951 – 6 October 2004) was an Anglo-Irish comedian, radio and television presenter and travel writer. He was noted for his best-selling travel books McCarthy's Bar (2000) and The Road to McCarthy (2002), in which he explored western Ireland and the Irish diaspora around the world.

== Summary ==
Born in Warrington, Lancashire to an English father of Irish descent and an Irish mother, McCarthy spent much of his early life in Ireland and developed a love for the country. He decided to become a writer and studied English at Leicester University. After a brief stint as a teacher he moved to Brighton, where he became involved in local art community projects. He discovered a talent for comedy and co-founded a successful comedy troupe in which he wrote and performed for ten years.

He became a solo stand-up comic and comedy writer, and after success with The Hangover Show in 1990 he presented television and radio shows. In 2000 he published McCarthy's Bar, an account of his travels around Western Ireland. He followed McCarthy's Bar in 2002 with The Road to McCarthy. A third book remained unfinished when he died of cancer in 2004.

== Biography ==
=== Early life: 1951–1974 ===
McCarthy was born on 9 November 1951 in Warrington, Lancashire. His Irish mother had moved to England during the Second World War to work as a nurse and met her future husband at a dance. They had four children of whom Peter was the first. McCarthy was educated at West Park Grammar School in St Helens, a Roman Catholic institution run by the Christian Brothers. He later described this experience as "a mixture of hellfire and brimstone, corporal punishment and awakening sexuality". The Christian Brothers' authoritarian education methods, which included "a fair bit of random brutality", he described as "carrot and stick without the carrot".

As a child, he spent his school holidays in Drimoleague in West Cork, Ireland, and stayed with relatives on the farm called "Butlersgift" where his mother had grown up, a place he later described as "straight from a story book". This time spent in Ireland inspired a fascination with the country that was evident later in his travel writing. In his teenage years he considered becoming a member of the Roman Catholic clergy, but was dissuaded by his local priest. After reading James Joyce's Portrait of the Artist at the age of 14, he decided instead to be a writer.

McCarthy attended Leicester University and earned a first-class degree in English literature. He studied at a teacher training college and taught English and Drama at a comprehensive school on the coast of Suffolk.

=== Comedy and television: 1975–1997 ===
In 1975, McCarthy moved to Brighton, East Sussex, and worked in a community arts project in nearby Shoreham-by-Sea, which led to his first television appearance on Tommy Tractor's Triffic Toyshop Show (1977), a show for primary school children. He moved into comedy, co-founded Cliff Hanger Theatre with friends Robin Driscoll, Steve McNicholas, Tony Haase and Rebecca Stevens, and discovered a talent for verbal repartee. He was described as "a brilliantly funny writer and performer".

The Cliff Hanger company toured the country performing in pubs. Their first show, The Featherstone Flyer (1978), was premiered in the Hope and Anchor in Islington, North London. The Featherstone Flyer was followed by Dig for Victory (1980–81), Captive Audience (1981–82), They Came From Somewhere Else! (1982–83), Gymslip Vicar (1984–85), which was nominated for a Laurence Olivier Award, and James Bond (1988). The success of the stage shows led to the creation of two television series, They Came From Somewhere Else (1984) for Channel 4 and Mornin' Sarge (1989) on BBC2.

In 1987, McCarthy began performing solo stand-up comedy, adopting his mother's surname as his stage name after learning of another actor using the name Peter Robinson. For the 1987 Brighton Festival he created Boredom and Black Magic in Hove, a three-hour coach tour and pub crawl. McCarthy acted as guide, inventing surreal explanations for the sights of Hove. Audiences "had to jump across the border from Brighton to Hove, where they were handed a glass of sweet sherry. Pete then took them on a tour around Hove, making up the sights as he went along." The show won the best cabaret act in the 1987 Zap Club Awards.

McCarthy took his next show, Live in Your Living Room, from 1987–88 to the Edinburgh, Melbourne and Brighton festivals. He performed in people's homes in bedrooms, bathrooms and living rooms to audiences of 10-20. The subject of the show was the metaphysical effects of a hangover. The Brighton Argus reviewer wrote, "The hour-long tour-de-force begins with an apparently hungover Peter in bed, surrounded by empty bottles, and transfers to the living room, where he sports a revolting 1970s stretch burgundy outfit, threatens a striptease and then fortunately changes his mind....In between he delivers a quick-fire monologue which develops from the perils of drinking to tragicomic stuff touching on loneliness, death and unrequited love."

In 1990 McCarthy explored this theme further in The Hangover Show, directed by John Dowie. He was awarded the Critic's Award for Best Comedy and nominated for the Perrier Award at the Edinburgh Festival Fringe. The show was developed into a one-off television special for BBC Scotland which was broadcast on New Year's Day 1991.

He regularly compered at The Comedy Store in Central London. As a stand-up comedian, McCarthy often drew on his Irish Catholic background as a source of material. The Guardian described him as "someone who took infinite pleasure in the comic strangeness of other human beings." He wrote and performed in a two-man comedy show with the Liverpudlian poet Roger McGough which toured in Britain and Australia. In the 1980s he wrote television scripts and gags for the comedians Mel Smith and Griff Rhys Jones.

As a result of The Hangover Show, McCarthy was given his own unconventional 'alternative' travel show, Travelog, by Channel 4. McCarthy recalled: "We travelled to Zanzibar and China, Fiji and Corsica, Costa Rica and Laos, stood on the edge of volcanoes, had lunch with heroes of the Crete resistance, and got caught up in a military coup in Vanuatu". He starred in a string of other television and radio shows throughout the 1990's, including BBC 2's Country Tracks (1998); Meridian Television's The Pier; and Channel 4's Desperately Seeking Something (1995–1998), an exploration of alternative religious movements around the world. For BBC Radio 4, he presented Breakaway, First Impressions, X Marks the Spot, American Beauty, and Cajun Country, as well as appearing as a regular guest on Loose Ends, Just a Minute and The News Quiz.

=== Travel writing: 1998–2004 ===
A Brighton and Hove Bus named in honour of Pete McCarthy

In March 1998 Hodder and Stoughton published McCarthy's first travel book, McCarthy's Bar: A Journey Of Discovery In Ireland, in which he described his travels and adventures in the west of the country, from Cork to Donegal, and the people he encountered during a quest to find pubs and bars called McCarthy's. The Daily Telegraph described the book as an "affectionate, revealing and well-lubricated look at the changing face of a country".

McCarthy won "Newcomer of the Year" at the British Book Awards in 2002. McCarthy's Bar was a great success, selling over a million copies. McCarthy admitted to a childlike pleasure in seeing his book take its place on the shelves among writers he had admired for years, and joked "If the literary life gets a little dull, there's always the thrill of going into W H Smith and moving McCarthy's Bar in front of Bill Bryson." His follow-up travel book, The Road to McCarthy, an account of further Irish-themed travels in Gibraltar, Morocco, New York City, Montana, Tasmania, Montserrat and Alaska in search of a McCarthy clan chieftain, was published in 2002.

Peter McCarthy wrote his books with pen and paper. Asked if he was a technophobe, he said: "Yes, big time. I've got a kettle and a fridge, but I don't own a computer, a word processor or even a typewriter."

He said in McCarthy's Bar that his grandfather's surname had been spelled 'MacCarthy'. "It's a translation from the Irish, the 'a' is optional." An uncle in County Cork told him that names of his ancestors in the 1700s had been recorded as "MacCartai".

== Later life and death ==
McCarthy moved with his family from Brighton to a village in the South Downs in East Sussex and enjoyed taking solitary walks across the Downs. He described the landscape as "a kind of neolithic M25". After the success of his previous books, he was planning to write a third travel work exploring the six counties of Northern Ireland.

McCarthy was diagnosed with cancer in February 2004 and died at the Royal Sussex Hospital in Brighton on 6 October 2004 at the age of 52. He was survived by his wife Irene and three daughters, Alice, Isabella and Coral.

Bus operator Brighton & Hove named one of its fleet, bus 913, after him in September 2006.

== Radio credits ==
Radio shows McCarthy presented:

- Breakaway
- First Impressions
- X Marks the Spot
- American Beauty
- Cajun Country

Radio shows he regularly appeared in:

- Loose Ends
- Just a Minute
- The News Quiz

== Television credits ==
McCarthy presented:

- Travelog
- Country Tracks
- The Pier
- Desperately Seeking Something

He appeared in:

- They Came from Somewhere Else

== Awards ==
- Critics' Award for Best Comedy, Edinburgh Festival Fringe 1990 for Hangover Show
- Nominated for the Edinburgh Comedy Award for best show 1990
- Newcomer of the Year, British Book Awards 2002
