= Enright =

Enright is an Irish surname, an Anglicised form of the patronym Mac Ionnrachtaigh, meaning "son of Ionnrachtach". The surname Hanratty has a similar origin.

People whose family name is or was Enright include:

- Andrew Coulter Enright, American artist
- Anne Enright, Irish novelist
- Barbara Enright, professional poker player
- Barry Enright, professional baseball starting pitcher for the Arizona Diamondbacks
- Brock Enright, American artist
- Charlie Enright, American sailor
- Corey Enright, Australian Rules footballer playing for the Geelong Football Club
- Dan Enright, American television producer
- Derek Enright, British Labour Party politician
- D. J. Enright, British academic, poet, novelist and critic
- Dick Enright, American football player and coach
- Dom Enright, Irish hurler
- Eddie Enright, Irish hurler
- Edmund Enright, Irish singer-songwriter better known as Mundy
- Elizabeth Enright, American children's author and illustrator
- George Enright, American baseball player
- Gerry Enright, Irish Gaelic football player
- Harold Enright, American track and field athlete
- Jack Enright, American baseball player
- James Enright, American professional basketball referee
- James Enright, Canadian Paralympic athlete
- Jim Enright, American pornographic film director
- Jim T. Enright, professor of behavioral physiology at the Scripps Institution of Oceanography
- Jo Enright, British comedian and comic actress
- Joe Enright, Irish footballer
- John Enright, United States Navy sailor, a recipient of the Medal of Honor
- Joseph F. Enright, submarine captain in the United States Navy
- Leo J. Enright, Irish broadcaster and veteran space commentator
- Leonard Enright, Irish hurler
- Olwyn Enright, Irish Fine Gael politician
- Maginel Wright Enright, American children's book illustrator and graphic artist
- Marlene Enright, Irish singer
- Mary Enright, New Zealand teacher, journalist and community worker
- Maurice Enright, Irish-American gangster
- Michael Enright (disambiguation)
  - Michael Enright, British actor and volunteer for Kurdish forces
  - Michael Enright, Canadian radio broadcaster
  - Michael Enright, Irish Democratic Left politician
- Nick Enright, Australian dramatist and playwright
- Paddy Enright, Irish hurler
- Peter Enright, Australian cricket Test match umpire
- Philip King Enright, British admiral of the Royal Navy
- Ray Enright, American film director
- Ray Enright (Canadian football), Canadian football player
- Rex Enright, American football and basketball player, coach, and college athletics administrator
- Robert Enright, Canadian journalist
- Richard Enright, NYPD Police Commissioner from 1918 until 1925
- Shane Enright, Irish Gaelic football player
- Stephanie Enright, Puerto Rican volleyball player
- Thomas Enright, American serviceman of World War I
- Thomas Jones Enright, American mathematician
- Tom Enright, Irish Fine Gael politician
- Walter John Enright, Australian solicitor and amateur anthropologist
- William Benner Enright, Senior United States District Judge of the United States District Court for the Southern District of California
