= Head First (book series) =

Instructional book series

Head First is a series of introductory instructional books to many topics, published by O'Reilly Media. It stresses an unorthodox, visually intensive, reader-involving combination of puzzles, jokes, nonstandard design and layout, and an engaging, conversational style to immerse the reader in a given topic.

Originally, the series covered programming and software engineering, but is now expanding to other topics in science, mathematics and business, due to success. The series was created by Bert Bates and Kathy Sierra, and began with Head First Java in 2003.

== Concept ==
The main idea of the series is to effectively stimulate the brain by:

- Telling stories
- Visualizing
- Using attention-grabbing tactics: page layout, non-standard examples, puzzles, jokes, and other means.

By using metacognition the series' authors and editors try to employ varied methods to present information and accelerate the learning process.

== Books ==
The offerings in the Head First series are quickly expanding. The books are also delving into subjects that are not directly related to IT, such as Math (Head First Algebra, Head First Statistics), Science (Head First Physics) and project management (Head First PMP). The books are also gaining some popularity for classroom use because of their novel approach to their subject matters.

The official web site for the Head First series has forums for each book as well as code downloads and sample chapters. They include:

- Head First Agile (ISBN 978-1449314330) by Andrew Stellman and Jennifer Greene
- Head First Ajax (ISBN 0-596-51578-2) by Rebecca Riordan
- Head First Algebra (ISBN 0-596-51486-7) by Dan Pilone and Tracey Pilone
- Head First Android Development (ISBN 1-4493-6213-3) by Dawn Griffiths and David Griffiths
- Head First C (ISBN 1-4493-9991-6) by David Griffiths and Dawn Griffiths
- Head First C# (ISBN 0-596-51482-4) by Andrew Stellman and Jennifer Greene
- Head First Data Analysis (ISBN 0-596-15393-7) by Michael Milton
- Head First Design Patterns (ISBN 0-596-00712-4) by Eric Freeman, Elisabeth Freeman, Kathy Sierra and Bert Bates
- Head First EJB (ISBN 0-596-00571-7) by Kathy Sierra and Bert Bates
- Head First Excel (ISBN 0-596-80769-4) by Michael Milton
- Head First 2D Geometry (ISBN 0-596-80833-X) by Lindsey Fallow and Dawn Griffiths
- Head First Git (ISBN 1-492-09251-7) by Raju Gandhi
- Head First Go (ISBN 1-491-96955-5) by Jay McGavren
- Head First HTML and CSS (ISBN 0-596-15990-0) by Elisabeth Robson and Eric Freeman
- Head First HTML with CSS & XHTML (ISBN 0-596-10197-X) by Elisabeth Freeman and Eric Freeman
- Head First HTML5 Programming (ISBN 1-4493-9054-4) by Eric Freeman and Elisabeth Robson
- Head First iPhone Development (ISBN 0-596-80354-0) by Dan Pilone and Tracey Pilone
- Head First iPhone and iPad Development (ISBN 1-4493-8782-9) by Dan Pilone and Tracey Pilone
- Head First Java (ISBN 0-596-00920-8) by Kathy Sierra and Bert Bates
- Head First JavaScript (ISBN 0-596-52774-8) by Michael Morrison (Out of Print)
- Head First JavaScript Programming (ISBN 978-1-449-34013-1) by Eric Freeman, Elisabeth Freeman
- Head First jQuery (ISBN 1-4493-9321-7) by Ryan Benedetti and Ronan Cranley
- Head First Kotlin (ISBN 978-1491996690) by Dawn Griffiths and David Griffiths
- Head First Learn to Code (ISBN 978-1-491-95886-5) by Eric Freeman
- Head First Mobile Web (ISBN 1-4493-0266-1) by Lyza Danger Gardner, Jason Grigsby
- Head First Networking (ISBN 0-596-52155-3) by Ryan Benedetti, Al Anderson
- Head First Object-Oriented Analysis and Design (ISBN 0-596-00867-8) by Brett McLaughlin, Gary Pollice and David West
- Head First PHP & MySQL (ISBN 978-0-596-00630-3) by Lynn Beighley and Michael Morrison
- Head First Physics (ISBN 0-596-10237-2) by Heather Lang
- Head First PMP (ISBN 0-596-10234-8) by Jennifer Greene and Andrew Stellman
- Head First Programming (ISBN 0-596-80237-4) by Paul Barry and David Griffiths
- Head First Python (ISBN 1-4493-8267-3) by Paul Barry
- Head First Rails (ISBN 0-596-51577-4) by David Griffiths
- Head First Ruby (ISBN 1-449-37265-1) by Jay McGavren
- Head First Servlets & JSP (ISBN 0-596-51668-1) by Bryan Basham, Kathy Sierra and Bert Bates
- Head First Software Architecture (ISBN 978-1-098-13435-8) by Raju Gandhi, Mark Richards and Neal Ford
- Head First Software Development (ISBN 0-596-52735-7) by Dan Pilone and Russ Miles
- Head First SQL (ISBN 0-596-52684-9) by Lynn Beighley
- Head First Statistics (ISBN 0-596-52758-6) by Dawn Griffiths
- Head First Web Design (ISBN 0-596-52030-1) by Ethan Watrall and Jeff Siarto
- Head First WordPress (ISBN 0-596-80628-0) by Jeff Siarto

== Head First Labs ==
O'Reilly established Head First Labs, where books of the series are presented and the main idea behind the series is explained. The Labs also hosts blogs by some of their authors and hosts some applets that complement their books.

== Awards ==
The books in the series have received three nominations for Product Excellence Jolt Awards, winning in 2005 for Head First Design Patterns, and were recognized on Amazon.com's yearly top 10 list for computer books from 2003 to 2005.

== See also ==
- List of computer books
