= Maurice Donegan =

Maurice Donegan may refer to:

- Maurice F. Donegan (1875–1950), American jurist and lawyer from Iowa
- Maurice Donegan (Irish republican) (1899–1974), officer in the Irish Republican Army
