= Mirror Worlds =

American software company

Mirror Worlds Technologies, Inc.
- Industry: software
- Headquarters: New Haven, Connecticut
- Key people: David Gelernter; Eric Freeman

Mirror Worlds Technologies, Inc., was a company based in New Haven, Connecticut, that created software using ideas from the book Mirror Worlds: or the Day Software Puts the Universe in a Shoebox...How It Will Happen and What It Will Mean (1992) by Yale professor David Gelernter, who helped found the company with Eric Freeman and served as chief scientist.

Gelernter believed that computers could free users from being filing clerks, by organizing their data. The company's main product, Scopeware, was released in March 2001 and attempted to organize a user's files into time-based "streams" and make such data more easily accessible across networks and a variety of devices. The company saw few sales, and announced it would "cease operations effective May 15, 2004."

On March 14, 2008, Mirror Worlds, LLC, of Tyler, Texas (a subsidiary of Plainfield Specialty Holdings I, Inc.), filed suit against Apple, Inc., for patent infringement of U.S. Patent No. 6,006,227 in United States District Court for the Eastern District of Texas in Tyler, Texas. The infringement was alleged to occur in the Cover Flow, Time Machine, and Spotlight features found in Mac OS X and iOS software used for many of Apple's products.

On October 4, 2010, a jury awarded Mirror Worlds, LLC, $625.5 million in damages, but Apple appealed the award, citing various legal arguments, and the judge stayed the ruling to allow both parties to submit post-trial arguments. The initial ruling was "the second-biggest jury verdict in 2010, and the fourth-biggest patent verdict in U.S. history", according to Bloomberg News.

On April 4, 2011, "U.S. District Judge Leonard E. Davis of Tyler ruled that Apple did not infringe on (the) patent", and overturned the jury verdict.

On June 24, 2013, the Supreme Court of the United States declined to hear the appeal by Mirror Worlds, thereby letting stand the district court ruling that Apple didn't infringe on any patents.

On May 9, 2017, Mirror Worlds filed a second patent infringement lawsuit against Facebook, Inc. (later renamed Meta Platforms, Inc.) in the U.S. District Court for the Southern District of New York, alleging infringement of U.S. Patent No. 6,006,227 (the same patent in the previous Texas case against Apple), as well as related U.S. Patent Nos. 7,865,538 and 8,255,439, based primarily on the Facebook "News Feed" and "Timeline" features. On March 8, 2022, the district court granted summary judgment in favor of Facebook/Meta, based on non-infringement of the three asserted patents. On December 4, 2024, the U.S. Court of Appeals for the Federal Circuit issued a precedential decision affirming the district court's summary judgment ruling.
