= Bantry =

Town in County Cork, Ireland

Bantry Beanntraí
- Town
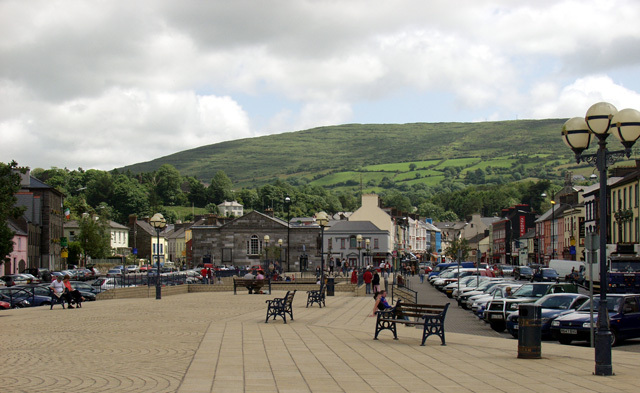
- Bantry town square

- Coat of arms
- Motto: Na Cluinter Claoitect Oraibh (Irish) "Never may defeat be told of you"
- Location in Ireland
- Coordinates: 51°40′47″N 9°27′12″W
- Country: Ireland
- Province: Munster
- County: County Cork

Area
  - Total: 10.1 km^{2} (3.9 sq mi)

Population (2022)
  - Total: 2,929
  - Density: 290/km^{2} (751/sq mi)
- Time zone: UTC±0 (WET)
  - Summer (DST): UTC+1 (IST)
- Eircode routing key: P75
- Telephone area code: +353(0)27
- Irish grid reference: V997488
- Website: Bantry.ie

Bantry (Irish: Beanntraí, meaning '(place of) Beann's people') is a town in the civil parish of Kilmocomoge in the barony of Bantry on the southwest coast of County Cork, Ireland. It lies in West Cork at the head of Bantry Bay, a deep-water gulf extending for 30 km (19 mi) to the west. The Beara Peninsula is to the northwest, with Sheep's Head peninsula to the southwest.

The focus of the town is a large square, formed partly by infilling of the shallow inner harbour. In former times, this accommodated regular cattle fairs; after modernising as an urban plaza, it now features a weekly market and occasional public functions. Two piers protect the harbour.

Bantry is in the Dáil constituency of Cork South-West.

== History ==
As with other areas on Ireland's southwest coast, Bantry also claims an ancient connection to the sixth-century saint Breandán (Naomh Bréanainn) the Navigator. In Irish lore, Saint Breandán was the first person to discover America. To the west of the town is the graveyard marking the site of a 15th-century Franciscan friary, of which nothing remains. Saint Cannera, who lived as a hermitess in the area during the sixth century, is also associated with the parish.

In past centuries, Bantry was a base for major pilchard fisheries and was visited by fishing fleets from Spain, France and the Netherlands. It was still a very small town in 1689 when it was described by the Jacobite army officer and future author John Stevens as "a miserable poor place, hardly worth the name of a town", consisting of "seven or eight small houses, and some mean little cottages".

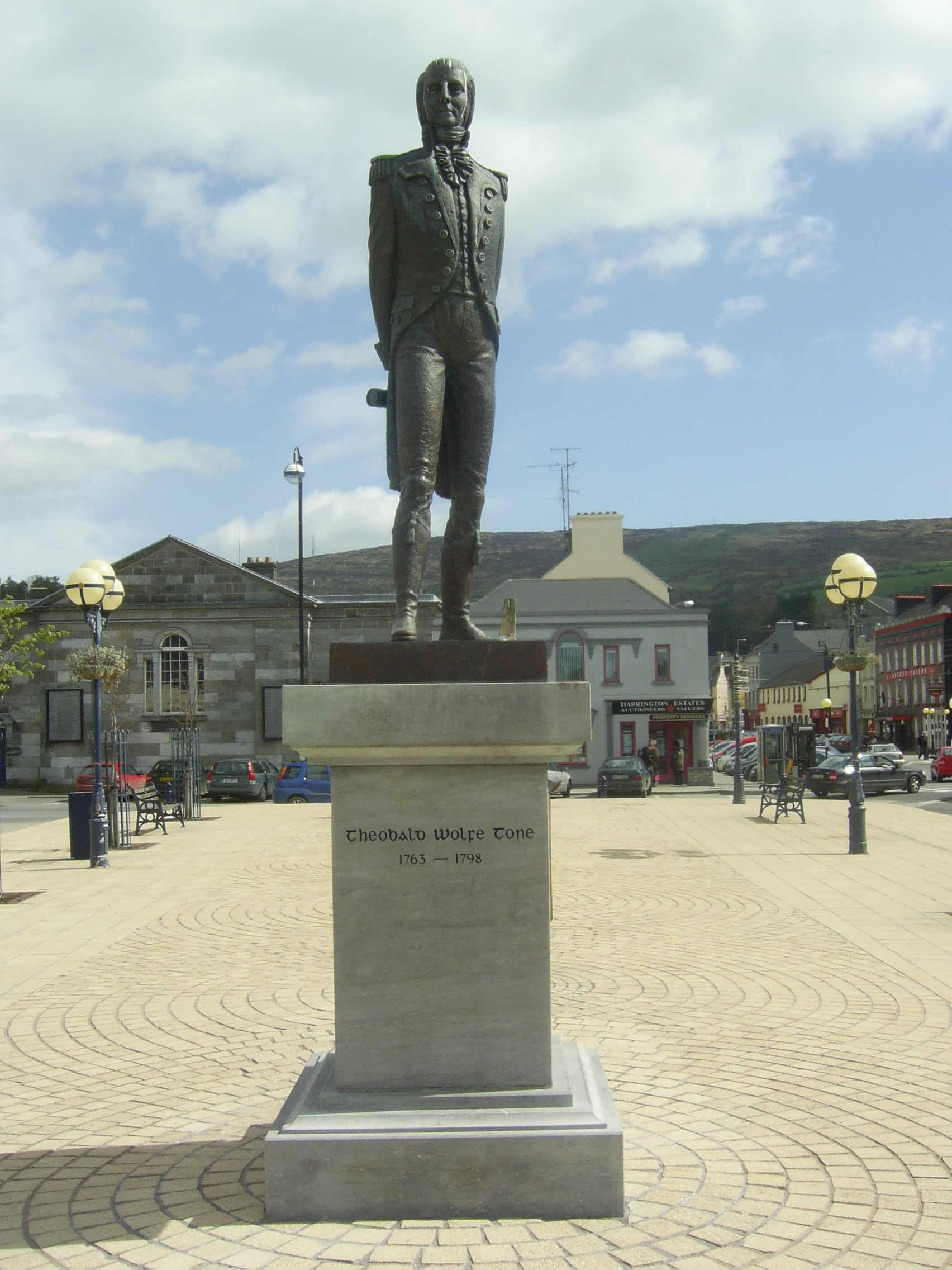
The town square, Wolfe Tone Square, has a statue of Theobald Wolfe Tone.

Wolfe Tone Square in the town commemorates Theobald Wolfe Tone, a leader during the 1798 rebellion. In the lead up to the rebellion, Dublin-born Tone led the republican United Irishmen in what he had hoped would be a local re-run of the recent French Revolution; this was to be achieved with the help of French Republicans in overthrowing British rule. The ill-fated French invasion fleet, known as the French expedition to Ireland, arrived in the area in 1796, but its purpose was frustrated by unfavourable winds. For his efforts in preparing the local defences against the French, Richard White, a local landowner, was created Baron Bantry in 1797 by a grateful British administration. A Viscountcy followed in 1800 and in 1816 he became the 1st Earl of Bantry. The mansion and gardens in the Bantry House demesne on the outskirts of the town testify to the family's status.

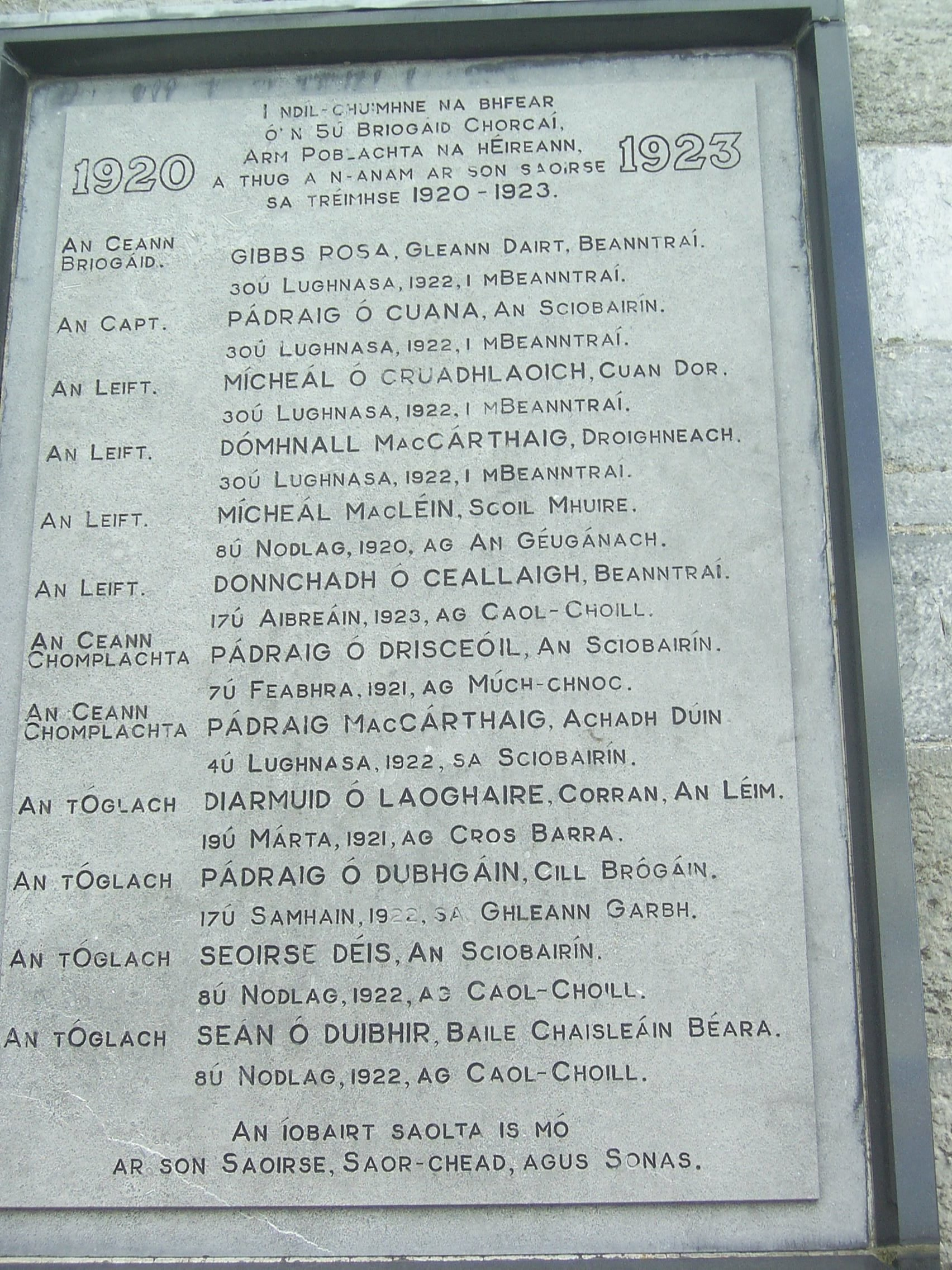
Irish War of Independence commemorative plaque

During the Irish War of Independence, the 5th and 3rd Cork Brigade of the Irish Republican Army were active in Bantry, and some members remained so during the Civil War that followed. Action by British forces included the punitive firebombing of several buildings in the town. The names of those who died between 1920 and 1923 "In Defence of the Republic" are listed on the wall of the former courthouse in Wolfe Tone Square.

Sheltering the head of the bay is Whiddy Island, site of a large oil terminal, originally owned by Gulf Oil. On 8 January 1979 the oil tanker Betelgeuse exploded, killing all 42 crew members, as well as seven employees at the terminal. The jetty was seriously damaged, but the storage tanks were not affected. Nevertheless, 250 employees at the terminal, one of the largest employers in the region, lost their jobs. There was also significant environmental impact and the local fishing industry was affected. Local interests subsequently initiated mussel-farming in the sheltered waters between Whiddy and the town.

In 1986, Gulf Oil surrendered its lease on the site to the Irish government. State investment in the 1990s restored part of the terminal and the Irish Government arranged for oil to be stored there during the First Gulf War in case of disruption to oil supplies; it currently holds one-third of the national strategic petroleum reserve. The facility passed from state ownership in 2001 with the proviso that it would remain operational for at least 15 years. It has since been owned and operated by US oil companies Tosco Corporation, ConocoPhillips, Phillips 66 and Zenith Energy Partners. At the time of acquisition by Zenith Energy Partners, the facility employed 30 people and supported up to 100 contractors. It has a storage capacity of more than eight million barrels of crude oil and refined products. The terminal saw a 15% decrease in oil traffic during 2015, according to figures released by the Port of Cork which operates the Bantry Bay port.

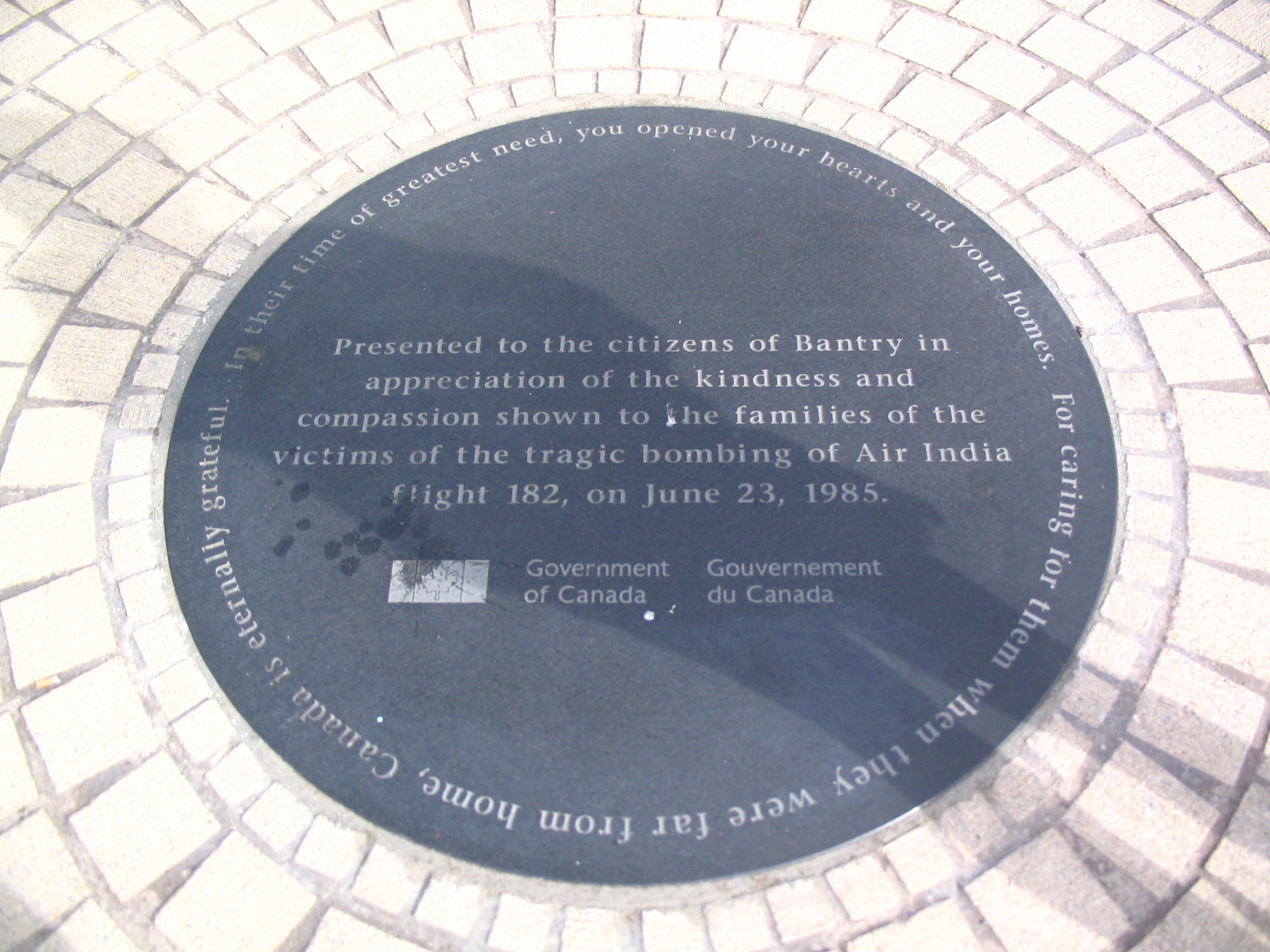
A commemorative plaque, presented to the citizens of Bantry by the Canadian Government for their kindness and compassion to the families of the victims of Air India Flight 182.

In 1985, Bantry became closely associated with the aftermath of the bombing of Air India Flight 182, which exploded and came down off the coast of West Cork, killing all 329 people on board. In the days and weeks following the disaster, Bantry became a focal point for the reception and support of victims’ families who travelled to the area. The compassion shown by local residents received international recognition, and in later years the Canadian Government presented a commemorative plaque to the people of Bantry in acknowledgment of their kindness and support .

Bantry made headlines in 2007 when the attempted landing of a cocaine shipment on the nearby coast was foiled, and again in 2017 when a "cocaine factory" was discovered in the area.

== Buildings of note ==
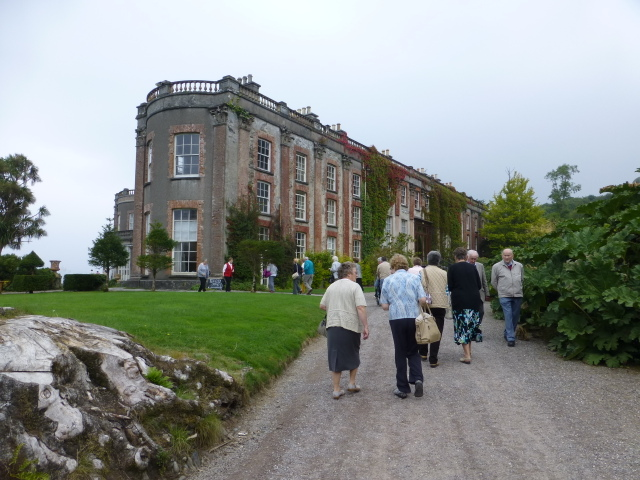
Bantry House

Bantry House is located west of the town and has been home to the White family since 1739, also serving as the seat of the Earls of Bantry. It contains a number of historic artefacts and paintings and is surrounded by formal gardens.

Other landmarks include Bantry Market House, and the Catholic and Church of Ireland parish churches. The public library and Garda (police) station are examples of modern architecture in the town.

== Economy ==
The town is a service centre for a large catchment area, including both the Beara and Sheep's Head peninsulas. Livestock fairs were held in the square in the past. It is no longer a major fishing port, mussel-farming having replaced the traditional trawling. Tourism has been a major part of the economy since the 19th century, exploiting the coastal scenery of the region, and the town contains a number of hotels and guesthouses. There are small-scale local industries, including pharmaceuticals, foodstuffs and building materials. Bantry became a Fairtrade Town in 2006.

Bantry hosts two cultural events each summer – the West Cork Chamber Music Festival and the West Cork Literary Festival. These feature musicians and writers of international stature, with performances at various venues in the town.

Bantry held the Atlantic Challenge International Contest of Seamanship in July 2012, in which 15 nations competed.

The inner harbour contains a marina comprising 40 berths and associated facilities, opened in 2017.

== Transport ==
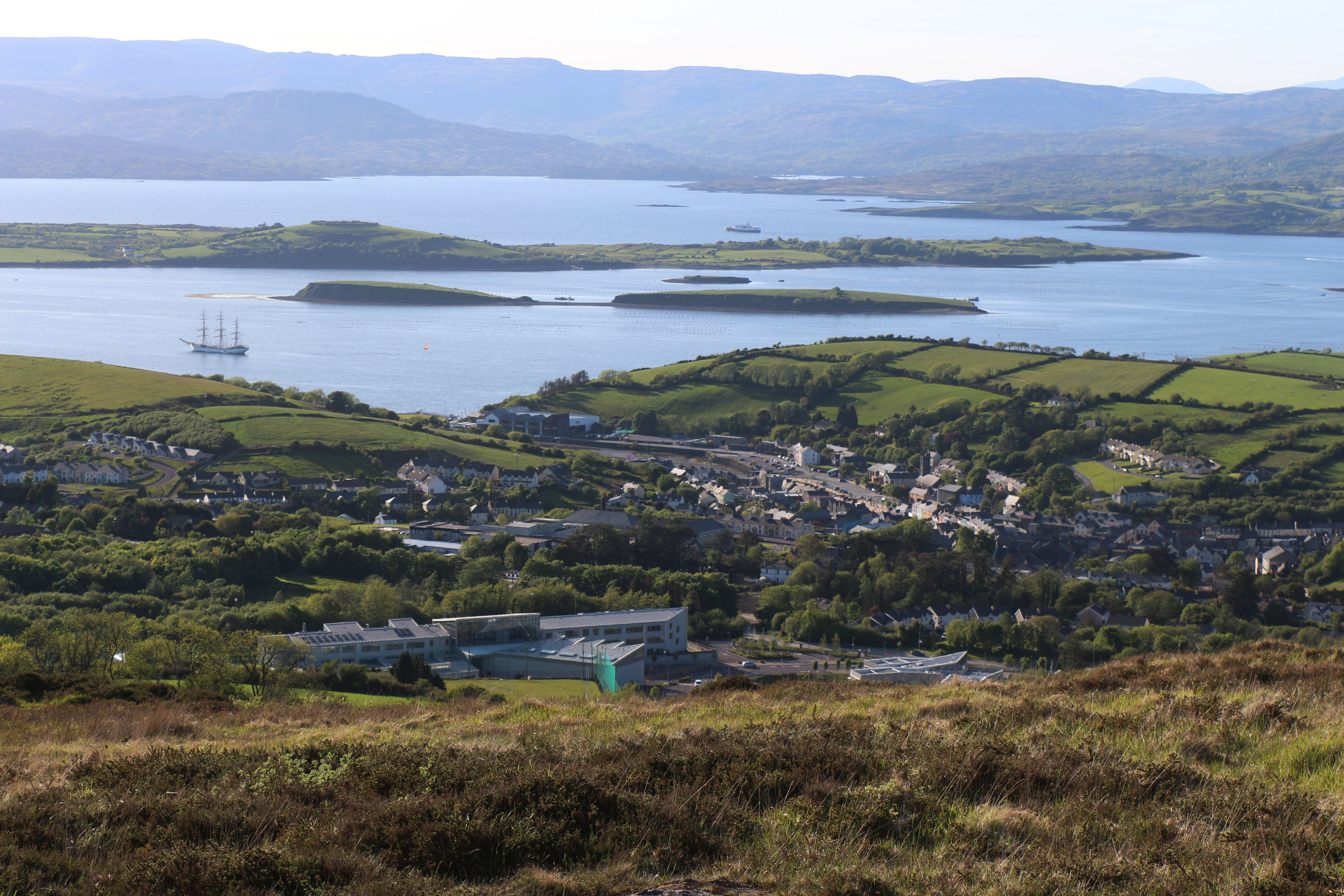
Bantry from the southeast

Bantry is accessed by the N71 national secondary road. Scheduled bus services connect the town with Cork city, Killarney, Castletownbere via Glengarriff (17 km north of Bantry) and some smaller local centres.

In the early 20th century, there was a regular steamship service from Bantry to Castletowbere on the Beara Peninsula. The also serving Glengarriff and Adrigole. Improvements to the roads and land transport eventually made this uneconomic.

As of the early 21st century, Bantry has been a port of call for smaller cruise liners, which anchor between the town and Whiddy Island.

Bantry has its own small privately owned airfield called Bantry Aerodrome, though the nearest large international airport is Cork Airport. Cork Airport is served by direct Bus Éireann buses from Bantry in the summer tourist season.

Bantry Town railway station, the western terminus of the Cork, Bandon and South Coast Railway, opened on 22 October 1892, but finally closed on 1 April 1961, and was subsequently demolished.

== Demographics ==
As of the 2022 census, Bantry had a usually resident population of 2,858. Of these, 70.4% identified as White Irish, 1.1% as White Irish Travellers and 15.0% as other white ethnicities. A further 0.6% identified as Black or Black Irish, 4.0% as Asian or Asian Irish and 2.2% as other ethnicities. 6.7% of the population did not state their ethnicity.

== Sport ==
The local Gaelic Athletic Association are the Bantry Blues. The area also has a golf club (Bantry Bay Golf Club), a sailing club (Bantry Bay Sailing Club), an association football club (Bantry Bay Rovers A.F.C.), rugby union and rowing clubs.

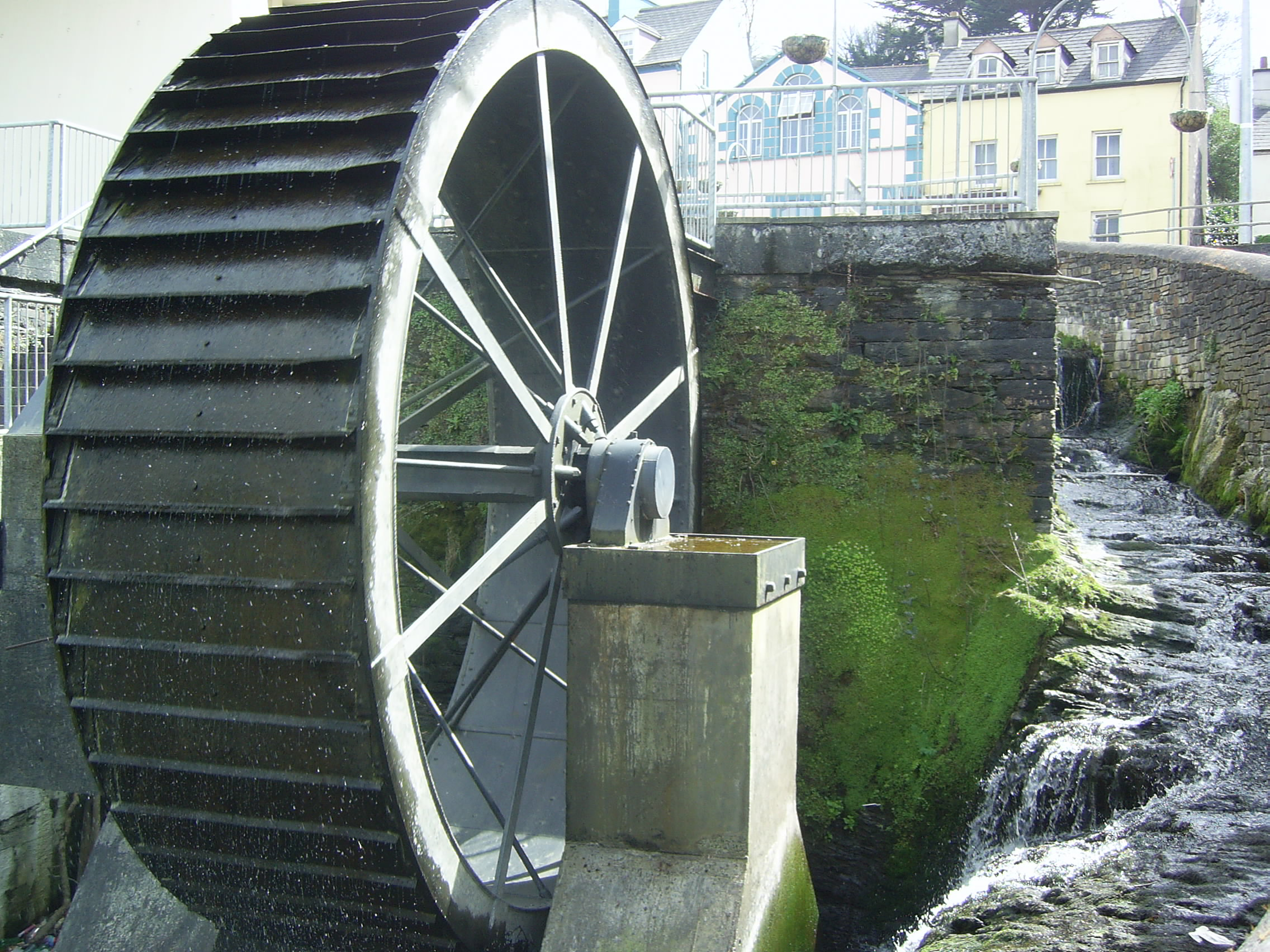
This historic mill-wheel beside Bantry library overlooks the town's main street.

== Notable people ==
- Graham Canty (b. 1980), Gaelic footballer who represented Bantry Blues and also captained the Cork senior team
- Anna Maria Desmond (1839–1921), a Roman Catholic nun and teacher in Queensland, Australia
- Maurice Donegan (1899–1974), was an officer in the Irish Republican Army (IRA) during the Irish War of Independence. He unsuccessfully contested the 1923 Irish general election as a Sinn Féin candidate.
- Marlene Enright (b. 1985), singer-songwriter
- Catherine Finegan (1931–2021), was the first Irish woman to be elected to Birmingham City Council.
- Tim Healy (1855–1931), was an Irish nationalist and Home Rule MP in Westminster. He later became the first Governor-General of the Irish Free State.
- William Martin Murphy (1845–1919), was a Catholic businessman and MP at Westminster who lived in Bantry for many years. Born in Castetownbere, he gained notoriety during the 1913 Dublin lock-out.
- Francis O'Neill (1848–1936), Chicago police superintendent and collector of Irish traditional music was born just outside Bantry.
- Derry O'Sullivan (1944–2025), a Paris-based Irish-language poet who wrote several poems about his native Bantry.
- John Sullivan (1830–1884), was a sailor and recipient of the Victoria Cross
- Fineen (b. 1997) and Josh Wycherley (b. 1999), professional rugby union players with Munster Rugby

== International relations ==
Bantry is twinned with:

- La Crosse, Wisconsin, United States
- Pont-'n-Abad, Brittany

== See also ==
- List of towns and villages in Ireland
- Market Houses in Ireland
- List of archaeological sites in County Cork including Bantry area.
- History of Durrus and District, contains references to Bantry and Bantry Bay
- County Cork (Parliament of Ireland constituency)
