= America-Lite =

2012 book by David Gelernter

America-Lite: How Imperial Academia Dismantled Our Culture (and Ushered in the Obamacrats)
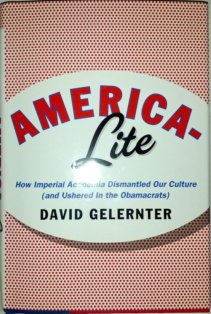
- America-Lite
- Author: David Gelernter
- Language: English
- Genre: Non-fiction
- Publisher: Encounter Books
- Publication date: June 26, 2012
- Publication place: United States
- Pages: 200
- ISBN: 978-1594036064

America-Lite: How Imperial Academia Dismantled Our Culture (and Ushered in the Obamacrats) is a 2012 book by David Gelernter, published by Encounter Books.

== Overview ==
In America-Lite, Gelernter argues that the profound changes in American society, especially between the 1960s and the 1980s, can be explained by an earlier rise of an academic class quite different from those who dominated pre-War American universities, especially in the Ivy League.

Gelernter views the changes in morality, social norms, and attitudes to normativity itself as principally an effect of these academics, recruited from the 1940s onwards, who selectively recruited colleagues sharing their world view, and taught this world view to their students. A confluence is seen in which acquiescence to academic expertise increases at the same time that core questions as human nature, right and wrong, art, equality, justice, progress, religion etc. are questioned by these experts. The uniformity of this expert opinion, along with ignorance by students of alternatives, is then seen as a relatively straightforward cause of very significant changes in society, rules, laws, regulations, expectations, and attitudes that come to mirror this post-modern world view.

== Reception ==
It was reviewed in The Chronicle of Higher Education in the article "Dreaming of a World With No Intellectuals", in Commentary magazine in the article "Reign of Ignorance", In a National Review interview "Dismantling Culture", as well as in Publishers Weekly, which said the book's "historical account of American educational reform is intriguing," but faulted its author's "unapologetic partisanship" and use of "simplistic metaphors and propagandist catchphrases."

Stephen Daisley wrote in Commentary magazine that Gelernter portrays Obama's presidency as a symbol of the failure of American education and the success of its replacement with a liberal indoctrination system. As a solution, Gelernter proposes moving all of human knowledge to online servers so that the in-person college experience can be replaced by user-driven self-education. Daisley wrote, "America-Lite is lean, incisive convincing, delightfully indelicate, and, in a break from the conventions of the literature on education, honest. It is a fine dissection—de-construction, if you must—of the corruption of higher education and the resulting debasement of political culture. If it makes its way on to a single college reading list, Hell will have frozen over." Russell Jacoby was sharply dismissive in his review of Gelernter's book. Among other criticisms he made, Jacoby said that Gelernter blamed intellectuals for causing the breakdown of patriotism and the traditional family but never explained how that came about.
