= Cover Flow =

Graphical user interface element integrated in the Macintosh Finder

- Developers: Originally Jonathan del Strother; subsequently developed by Apple Inc.
- Operating system: macOS (Mac OS X Leopard up to macOS High Sierra) (only supported in iTunes 7 onwards on Mac OS X Tiger) Windows (iTunes) iOS (iPhone OS 1–iOS 8.3) iPod Nano 3rd Generation iPod Nano 4th Generation iPod Nano 5th Generation iPod Classic 6th Generation
- Successor: Gallery View (macOS Mojave and above)
- Type: User interface
- License: Proprietary
- Website: www.steelskies.com

Interactive SVG simulating Cover Flow animation – in the SVG file, move the cursor left and right to navigate

Cover Flow is an animated, three-dimensional graphical user interface element that was integrated within the Macintosh Finder and other Apple Inc. products for visually flipping through snapshots of documents, website bookmarks, album artwork, or photographs.

Cover Flow is browsed using the on-screen scrollbar, mouse wheel, gestures, or by selecting a file from a list, which flips through the pages to bring the associated image into view. On iPod and iPhone devices, the user slides their finger across the touch screen or uses the click wheel.

Apple discontinued the use of Cover Flow after settling a patent suit against Mirror Worlds. It is now absent on the Mac in everything other than Finder with OS X El Capitan. In macOS Mojave, a completely different Gallery view feature replaces Cover Flow in Finder. It was removed from iOS in 2015 with the release of iOS 8.4, which replaced the Music app with Apple Music.

== History ==
Cover Flow was conceived by artist Andrew Coulter Enright and originally implemented by an independent Macintosh developer, Jonathan del Strother. Enright later named the interaction style fliptych to distinguish it from the particular Cover Flow implementation.

Cover Flow was purchased by Apple Inc. in 2006, and its technology was integrated into its music application, iTunes 7.0, which was released September 12, 2006. The name was previously "CoverFlow" without a space.

The last release of Steel Skies’ stand-alone application, version RC1.2, was released on September 10, 2006, and freely distributed until the end of the next day only; however, it remains available for download from MacUpdate.

On January 9, 2007, when Apple announced the iPhone, it was announced that it would incorporate Cover Flow technology.

During the WWDC Keynote on June 11, 2007, Steve Jobs announced that Cover Flow would be added as a view option in Mac OS X Leopard's Finder.

On September 5, 2007 Apple announced that Cover Flow would be utilized in the third generation iPod nano as well as the new iPod classic and iPod Touch models. Cover Flow was integrated into the fourth-generation iPod nano by the use of an accelerometer which accesses Cover Flow when the iPod nano is turned horizontally on its side.

On March 14, 2008, Mirror Worlds LLC sued Apple for infringing on its patents (nos. 6006227, 6638313, 6725427, and 6768999) (Mirror Worlds, LLC, vs Apple, Inc; Texas Eastern District Court)

On February 24, 2009, Cover Flow was also included with the public beta of Safari 4, with the final version of Safari 4, released on June 8, using Cover Flow to browse history, bookmarks, RSS feeds, Bonjour, and the Address Book.

In April 2010, Apple was granted US design patent D613,300 on the Cover Flow interface.

On October 1, 2010, Apple was ordered to pay $625.5 million to Mirror Worlds LLC for infringing utility patents relating to Cover Flow. On April 4, 2011, Judge Davis reversed the judgement.

With the release of version 11 of iTunes, Cover Flow was removed from the iTunes interface.

iOS 7 saw Cover Flow replaced by Album Wall. This feature shows tiles of album art in rows when the device is in landscape. This feature was removed with the release of Apple Music and iOS 8.4 on June 30, 2015.

In macOS Mojave, Cover Flow was removed from Finder and replaced by gallery view, marking the end of Cover Flow in all Apple products.

== Other implementations ==
- The open-source media player Songbird offers a Cover Flow navigation add-on called MediaFlow.
- The open source Banshee media player also offers a Cover Flow-like add-on called ClutterFlow, which is based on the Clutter toolkit.
- The proprietary media player MediaMonkey also offers a Cover Flow add-on called MonkeyFlow. It can either be embedded or run as an external remote application.
- Using Compiz Fusion (Shift Switcher), KDE Plasma Workspaces (Cover Switch on KWin 4.1 or later), or Muffin on a Unix-like system, it is possible to switch between open applications with a Cover Flow animation.
- A Cover Flow-like interface was used by the graphical search engine Search Me.
- When selecting music or course in arcade edition of Dance Dance Revolution X2 and later, a Cover Flow-style interface is used.
- The free jukebox firmware Rockbox also implements a Cover Flow-like album art viewer, called "PictureFlow". However, PictureFlow is not part of the main UI, instead included as a demo.
- A Cover Flow-like interface was used in the built-in music player app for latest Symbian OS versions (Anna and above).
- Reflection Music Player also implements a Cover Flow-like Music Player for the iPad Reflection Music Player with Cover Flow on iTunes.
- The open source ebook managing software calibre incorporates Cover Flow to browse through ebooks' covers.
- Open source multi-system game emulator OpenEmu includes a cover flow view.
- The proprietary Apple Music player Cider features a cover flow view mode.
- The Windows music player Foobar2000 offers a Cover Flow component
