= Worldbeam =

Also known as the Inside-Out web, Worldbeam is the brainchild of David Gelernter and Ajay Royan proposed in 2007; it envisions a single logical repository for all information on the internet, a concept not unlike what is now referred to as the "cloud".

== See also ==
- Information explosion
