= Linda-like systems =

Programing models

Linda-like systems are parallel and distributed programming models that use unstructured collections of tuples as a communication mechanism between different processes.

== Examples ==
In addition to proper Linda implementations, these include other systems such as the following:

- Intel Concurrent Collections (CnC) is a programming model based on "item collections" which resemble tuple spaces, but are single assignment (tuples may not be removed or replaced). Because of this restriction Concurrent Collections has a deterministic execution semantics, but has difficulties with storage deallocation.
