= Hanratty =

Hanratty is an Irish surname. It is the Anglicised form of the patronym Ó hIonnrachtaigh, meaning "descendent of Ionnrachtach". It may refer to:

- Alice Hanratty (1939–2025), Irish artist specialising in printmaking
- James Hanratty (1936–1962), the seventh-to-last person in Britain to be hanged for murder
- Pat Hanratty, Canadian social activist and former president of the New Brunswick New Democratic Party
- Sammi Hanratty (born 1995), American actress
- Terry Hanratty (born 1948), American football player

== See also ==
Related names of Irish, and Dutch Jewish surnames.

- Enright
- Kenraghty
