= Passing on the Right =

2016 book by Jon A. Shields and Joshua M. Dunn Sr.

Passing on the Right: Conservative Professors in the Progressive University
- Author: Jon A. Shields; Joshua M. Dunn Sr.
- Subject: Higher education; sociology; political science
- Publisher: Oxford University Press
- Publication date: 2016
- Publication place: United States
- Media type: Print; digital
- Pages: 256
- ISBN: 978-0-19-986305-1 (hardback)
- Dewey Decimal: 378.1/25
- LC Class: LB2331.72 .S55 2016

Passing on the Right: Conservative Professors in the Progressive University is a book-length study published in 2016 and written by Jon A. Shields and Joshua M. Dunn Sr. The study explored the question of the existence of a liberal or anti-conservative academic bias in the United States via interviews with 153 professors from 84 universities who identify as conservative.

== Authors ==
Jon A. Shields is an associate professor in the Department of Government at Claremont McKenna College. Joshua M. Dunn Sr. is an associate professor of political science and Director of the Center for the Study of Government and the Individual at the University of Colorado Colorado Springs.

The authors describe conservative professors as a "stigmatized minority" and having to use "coping strategies that gays and lesbians have used in the military and other inhospitable work environments" in order to hide their political identity, but caution that "the right-wing critique of the university is overdrawn". Shields stated his view that the populist right may overstate the bias that does exist and that conservatives can succeed using mechanisms like academic tenure to protect their freedom.

== Public reception ==
Vincent Cannato (University of Massachusetts Boston) said the book offers a "clear-eyed and rational discussion of modern academia that steers clear of polemics and challenges the dogmas of both the left and the right". Tyler Cowen found the book "subtle and thought provoking" concluding that "what also comes through in this book is the remarkable diversity of thought among the so-called 'intellectual right'". Jason Willick of The American Interest observed that the book "probably offers the most balanced and constructive portrait of the academic political culture to date". Jonathan Marks (Ursinus College) described the study as "the first of its kind" and found the results "intriguing". Writing in The New York Times, Arthur C. Brooks called it "an important book" that "gives a glimpse into the lonely lives of ideological strangers on the modern campus". The book, he said, pointed to a "deeper, subtler problem" than "violent campus mobs shutting down conservative speakers and freaked-out college administrators treating rioters with kid gloves": "the profound alienation of professors who don't hold the mainstream political views and are treated as outsiders as a result".

== Analyses ==
Several scholarly reviews have been published about the book.

Paul Hollander (2016) calls the book a "fair-minded and judicious study" but took issue with the selection process used in the study, pointing out that the authors did not avail themselves of the professors published in the journal Academic Questions nor a sample of members of the National Association of Scholars which publishes it, instead using online directories and less active conservative journals. Despite this shortcoming, Hollander takes no issue with the overall sample size nor the wide range of institutions represented. He notes that the authors recognize that the "major justification of the academic under-representation of conservatives is the dubious idea that conservatives lack the appropriate cognitive and psychological traits academic work requires, and are less open-minded than liberals" and points out that "few liberals or leftists would admit that conservatives are discriminated against", but that "anti-conservative bias resembles other, earlier prevalent racial, ethnic, or sexist biases, which too were always vehemently denied". In the book, Shields and Dunn note that "there is also little evidence that conservatives lack other cognitive traits that academic work requires, such as creativity or open-mindedness".

Bruce S. Thornton (2016) questions how representative the small sample size of the interviews could be, citing that it is 0.01 percent of the "1.5 million professors and 2500 four-year institutions in the United States" and noting that feedback in the interviews could be anecdotal, subjective, or otherwise unreliable. He takes issue with several conclusions of the authors. As to the authors claims that the impact of lack of ideological diversity on conservative professors is "overstate(d)" and "conservatives can survive and even thrive in the liberal university" despite being stigmatized, Thornton calls the claim "astonishing" and counters by noting the prevalence of massive student-organized protests over the previous year, videos of "students screaming and shrieking at faculty members", and frequent occurrences of visiting speakers being deplatformed. Pointing out the author's claim that there is no "widespread indoctrination" of students, Thornton says that "freshmen and sophomores are especially vulnerable" to such indoctrination by giving examples of how students on his own campus are "funneled" through courses rife with leftist ideology and identity politics. He cites recent surveys pointing out that a majority (53%) of millennials (ages 18–29) view socialism favorably, and 69% would vote for a socialist for president. Thornton praises the authors for their analysis of the academic history of eugenics, the civil rights movement, and that communism "leaves no room for conservative contributions to human progress".

Robert Whaples (2016) said that the book answers the question "What's it like being a conservative or libertarian professor in the American academy today?" in a "remarkably direct manner". On why there are so few conservatives in academia, he says, "Shields and Dunn note that some of the massive ideological imbalance is due to a selection effect – liberals are far more attracted to academia and likely to enter Ph.D. programs than conservatives. But they also demonstrate significant bias in hiring and promotion from the incumbent liberals who want to keep conservatives locked out." On how the absence of conservatives affects campus life, he says that the authors "explain that the one-sidedness of academia means crimes of omission – missing civil debates, missing perspectives, missing mentors, and missing reality checks make it harder to weigh and sift ideas in the pursuit of truth. Neither left nor right has a monopoly on truth. Debate and sharing of ideas is needed to discover it – and this is the loss when those on the right are excluded."

Donald Downs (2017) praised the book for its "fairness and objectivity". In particular, he argues that "the authors make a convincing case that the quality of research and academic knowledge has suffered from the lack of true engagement between the liberal and conservative perspectives that exist in the world beyond academia’s closeted gates". He concludes that “the need for more intellectual diversity on campus is clear, and Passing on the Right convincingly tells us why.”

Solon Simmons (2017) calls the study "a fascinating and engaging book about professorial politics" and a "must read for anyone who is interested in the subject". He finds many of the stories from the book both "jarring" and "revelatory". After reading the chapter on closeted conservatives, he says, "even the most committed progressive might find herself wondering how healthy is a state of affairs in which her conservative academic colleagues fear to be themselves, with the threat of stigma and even dismissal constantly haunting them."

== See also ==
- God and Man at Yale: The Superstitions of "Academic Freedom"
- The Closing of the American Mind
- Tenured Radicals: How Politics Has Corrupted Our Higher Education
