= Catherine Finegan =

Irish politician (1932-2022)

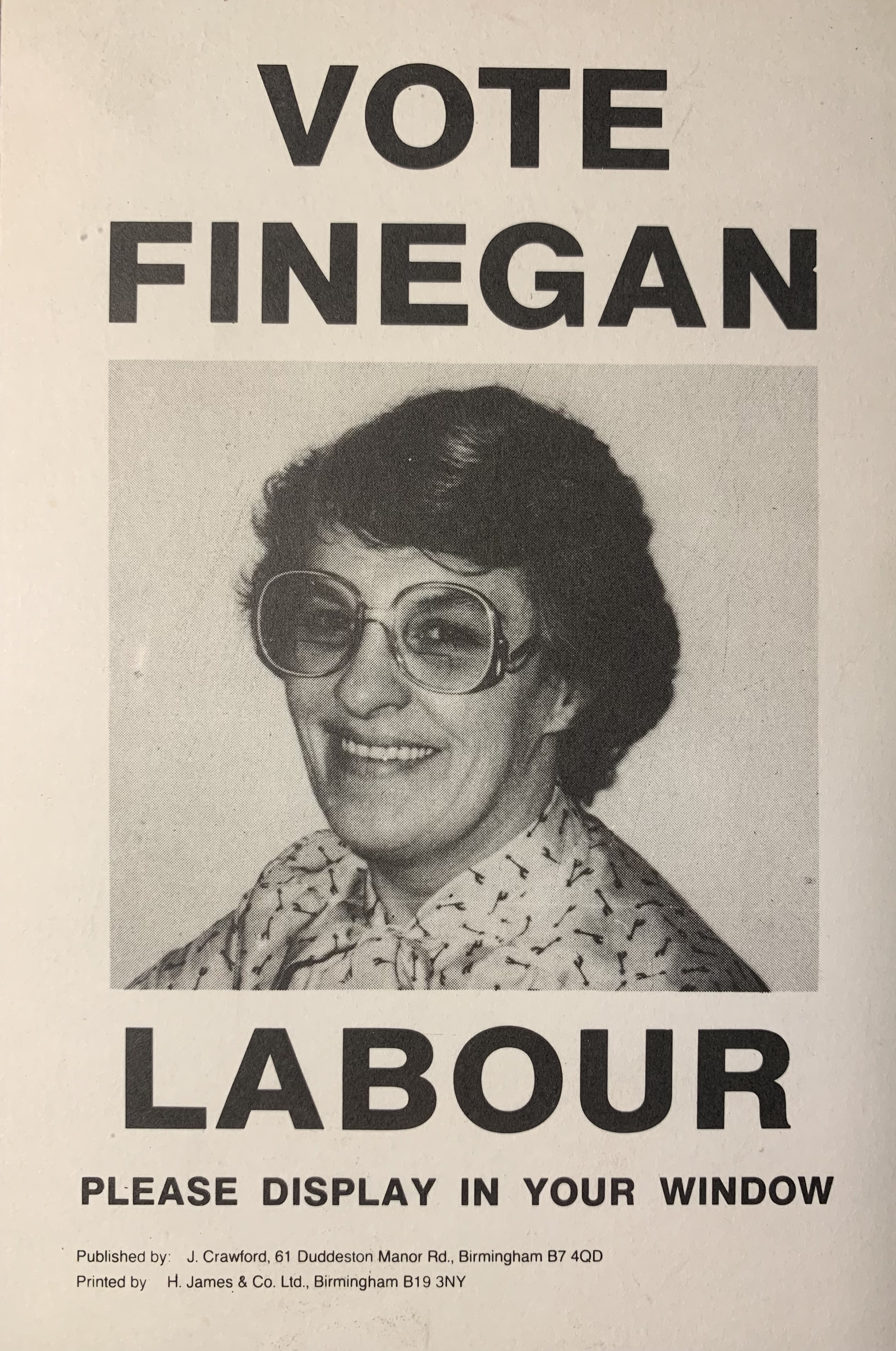

Catherine "Kathleen" Finegan (June 1931 – Dec 2021) was the first Irish woman to be elected to the Birmingham City Council.

Originally from Bantry, West Cork, Ireland, she emigrated to England in 1952, and settled in Birmingham, United Kingdom where she found work as a clippie on the buses of Birmingham City Transport. There she later met her husband whom she married in November 1954. While married and raising a family of six children, she studied at night at Matthew Boulton College and the Open University, while also working full-time at the Grand Hotel, where she also created the first staff union.

A lifelong campaigner for women's rights, and social justice issues, she was asked to become a Labour Party politician in 1978. Finegan stood for the Saltley ward in Birmingham, and thereby became the first Irish woman to be elected to Birmingham City Council. She was a politician of the city until 1999, serving on Social committees and helping families with adoption cases, as well as on the city Planning committees. For her services to the city, she was appointed Honorary Alderman of the City of Birmingham in 1999.
