= David Gelernter =

American computer scientist (born 1955)

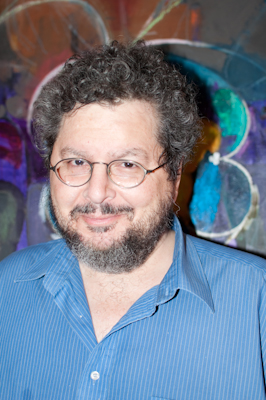
- Gelernter in 2011
- Born: David Hillel Gelernter; March 5, 1955 (age 71)
- Education: Yale University (BA, MA); Stony Brook University (PhD)
- Spouse: Jane Reader
- Awards: Member of the National Council on the Arts (2003)
- Scientific career
- Fields: Computer science
- Workplaces: Yale University
- Thesis: An Integrated Microcomputer Network for Experiments in Distributed Processing (1982)
- Doctoral advisor: Arthur Bernstein

David Hillel Gelernter (born March 5, 1955) is an American computer scientist and writer, and a professor of computer science at Yale University.

Gelernter is known for contributions to parallel computation in the 1980s, and for books on topics such as computed worlds (Mirror Worlds) and America-Lite: How Imperial Academia Dismantled Our Culture (and Ushered in the Obamacrats), that liberal academia has a destructive influence on American society.

In 1993, Gelernter was sent a mail bomb by Ted Kaczynski, also known as the Unabomber. He opened it and the resulting explosion almost killed him, leaving him with loss of use of his right hand as it destroyed four fingers, and permanent damage to his right eye.

Gelernter had a six-year correspondence with child sex offender Jeffrey Epstein from 2009 to 2015, and in 2026 was relieved of his teaching duties by Yale University when their email correspondence was publicly revealed following the Epstein Files Transparency Act.

== Early life and education ==
Gelernter grew up on Long Island, New York. His father, Herbert Gelernter, was a physicist who, in the late 1950s and 1960s, was a pioneer in artificial intelligence and taught computer science at State University of New York at Stony Brook. Gelernter's grandfather was a rabbi, and Gelernter grew up as a Reform Jew; he later became a follower of Orthodox Judaism.

After high school, Gelernter graduated cum laude from Yale University with a Bachelor of Arts in computer science and a Master of Arts in Classical Hebrew literature in 1976. He then earned his PhD in computer science from the State University of New York at Stony Brook in 1982.

== Career ==
=== Computer science and Yale University (1982-2026) ===
Gelernter joined the Yale University faculty in 1982.

In the 1980s, Gelernter made seminal contributions to the field of parallel computation, specifically the tuple space coordination model, as embodied by the Linda programming system he and Nicholas Carriero designed (which he named for Linda Lovelace, the lead actress in the porn movie Deep Throat, mocking the naming of the programming language Ada in tribute to the scientist and first attributed computer programmer, Ada Lovelace). Bill Joy cited the Linda system as the inspiration for many elements of JavaSpaces and Jini.

In January 1993, in his book Mirror Worlds: or the Day Software Puts the Universe in a Shoebox...How It Will Happen and What It Will Mean, Gelernter wrote: "people and software work hand-in-glove – and sometimes hand-in-hand."

On June 24, 1993, Gelernter was severely injured opening a mail bomb sent to him by the Unabomber. He recovered from his injuries, but his right hand (which he covers with a glove) and eye were permanently damaged. Some in the press suggested that there were parallels between his thoughts on the need for a human element to computers and those of the Unabomber. He chronicled the ordeal in his 1997 book Drawing Life: Surviving the Unabomber. Two years after the bombing, the Unabomber sent Gelernter a letter, writing: "People with advanced degrees aren't as smart as they think they are."

Gelernter helped found the company Mirror Worlds Technologies, which in 2001 released Scopeware software using ideas from his 1992 book Mirror Worlds. Gelernter believed that computers can free users from being filing clerks, by organizing their data. The product never took off, however, and the company ceased operations in 2004. In 2013, Mirror Worlds Technologies, LLC, a related company that had purchased its patents, filed a complaint of patent infringement against Apple, Best Buy, Dell, Hewlett Packard, Lenovo (United States), Lenovo Group, Microsoft, Samsung Electronic, and Samsung TeleCommunications in the United States District Court for the Eastern District of Texas. Ultimately, the company lost at the trial level and on appeal. A petition for writ of certiorari to have the case considered by the Supreme Court of the United States was denied in 2013. In 2016, the case was dismissed with prejudice.

In July 2019, Gelernter, along with three other co-founders, started Revolution Populi, a blockchain-powered crypto clearing house and social network.

=== Writing and art ===
Gelernter's paintings have been exhibited, sold, stolen and recovered in New Haven and Manhattan.

Gelernter has critiqued what he perceives as cultural illiteracy among students. In 2015, he commented,

They [students] know nothing about art. They know nothing about history. They know nothing about philosophy. And because they have been raised as not even atheists, they don't rise to the level of atheists, insofar as they've never thought about the existence or nonexistence of God. It has never occurred to them. They know nothing about the Bible.

— David Gelernter

In 2016, he said: "The [Yale University] faculty and the students don't have a clue what's going on in the world."

== Politics ==
Gelernter is a former national fellow at the American Enterprise Institute and senior fellow in Jewish thought at the Shalem Center. In 2003, he became a member of the National Council on the Arts. Time magazine profiled Gelernter in 2016, describing him as a "stubbornly independent thinker. A conservative among mostly liberal Ivy League professors, a religious believer among the often disbelieving ranks of computer scientists..."

Endorsing Donald Trump for president, in October 2016, Gelernter wrote an op-ed in The Wall Street Journal calling Hillary Clinton "as phony as a three-dollar bill", and saying that Barack Obama "has governed like a third-rate tyrant". In his capacity as a member of the Trump transition team, Peter Thiel nominated Gelernter for the Science Advisor to the President position; Gelernter met with Trump in January 2017, but did not get the job.

In 2018, he said that the idea that Trump is a racist is "absurd". In October 2020 he joined in signing a letter stating: "Given his astonishing success in his first term, we believe that Donald Trump is the candidate most likely to foster the promise and prosperity of America."

Gelernter has spoken out against women in the workforce, saying working mothers were harming their children and should stay at home. Gelernter has also argued for the U.S. voting age to be raised, on the basis that 18-year-olds are not sufficiently mature.

=== Positions on science ===
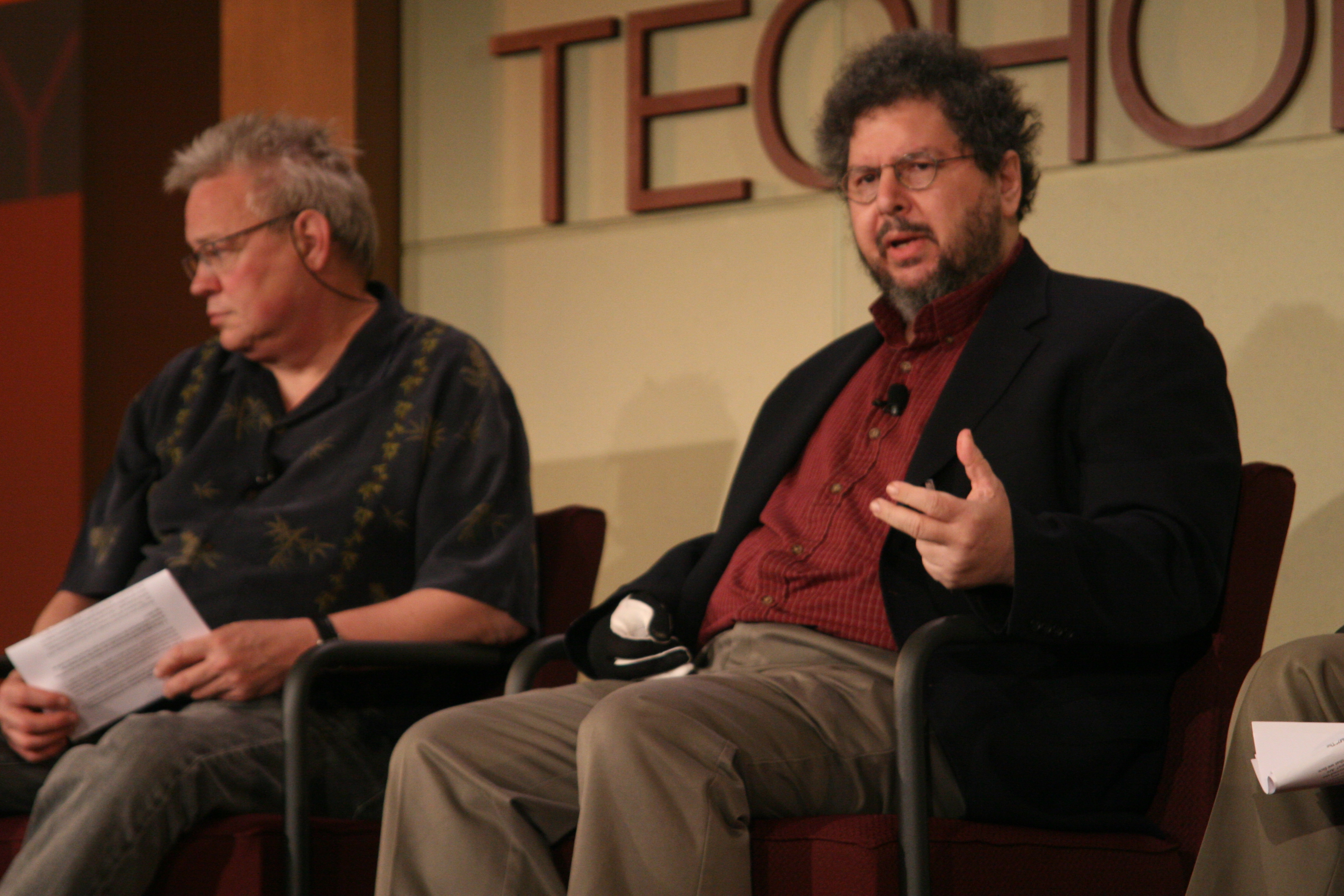
Gelernter in 2010

The Washington Post, profiling him in early 2017 as a potential science advisor to Donald Trump, called Gelernter "a vehement critic of modern academia" who has "condemned 'belligerent leftists' and blamed intellectualism for the disintegration of patriotism and traditional family values." Shortly thereafter, The Atlantic published a rebuttal of The Washington Post profile, saying it was "hard to imagine a more misleading treatment" of the "pioneering polymath" Gelernter.

Outside of his field, Gelernter has "expressed skepticism about the reality" of anthropogenic climate change, rejecting the scientific consensus in the field.

In a July 2019 review of Stephen Meyer's book Darwin's Doubt: The Explosive Origin of Animal Life and the Case for Intelligent Design, which Gelernter wrote for the Claremont Review of Books, he also rejected the scientific consensus of evolutionary biology. On the other hand, Gelernter stipulates he "cannot accept" intelligent design either, stating "as a theory, it would seem to have a long way to go." In a response published in Patheos in 2019, Bob Seidensticker wrote: "Let's subtitle this story, 'Guy who made his career in not-biology is convinced by other not-biologists that Biology's core theory is wrong.'" Fellow computer scientist and mathematician Jeffrey Shallit wrote:

Gelernter's review was not published in a science journal, but in a politics journal run by a far-right think tank. His review cites no scientific publications at all, and makes claims like 'Many biologists agree' and 'Most biologists think' without giving any supporting citations. So, not surprisingly ... Gelernter makes a fool of himself in his review, which resembles a 'greatest hits' of creationist misconceptions and lies.

— Jeffrey Shallit

== Association with Jeffrey Epstein ==
The January 2026 publication of the Epstein files revealed that Gelernter had written to Jeffrey Epstein numerous times between 2009 and 2015. In their correspondence, they scheduled visits (including at Epstein's home in New York City) and discussed the scent of women in Paris. In one 2011 email, Gelernter recommended an undergraduate student to Epstein for an editorial position in part because she was a "v[ery] small goodlooking blonde".

A large student backlash followed this revelation; the day after a Yale Daily News article was published reporting on the association, a group of roughly 30 students performed a sit-in in a lobby outside of Gelernter's computer science course. Gelernter later doubled down on his stance, telling colleagues that he was "very glad [he] wrote the note" and that Epstein "was obsessed with girls (like every other unmarried billionaire in Manhattan; in fact, like every other heterosex[ual] male), and if I hadn't said what I did in that letter ten-odd years ago, he would certainly have called me & asked for a lot more aesthetic detail. (This is how men behave.)"

In February 2026, Gelernter told students in his computer science course that he had been "relieved" of his teaching duties. Yale University's administration declared that "the professor’s conduct is under review," and that "until the review is completed, the professor will not teach his class."

In September 2026, the Yale Daily News reported that Gelernter's conduct was still under review and he would not teach in the Fall 2026 academic term. As of September 2026 he is listed as a professor in the faculty directory and Yale's website for managing payrolls.

== Books and book reviews ==
External videos
- Booknotes interview with Gelernter on Drawing Life, November 16, 1997, C-SPAN

Gelernter's book Mirror Worlds (1991) "prophesied the rise of the World Wide Web." Bill Joy, founder and chief scientist of Sun Microsystems, said Gelernter was "one of the most brilliant and visionary computer scientists of our time." The New York Times called him a computer science "rock star".

In The Muse in the Machine (1994), Gelernter theorized that creativity is based on the degree to which people focus their attention, arguing that "low focus", when attention is wandering or emotions interfere with rationality, is when people are creative. His book was harshly criticized. Psychologist Stuart Sutherland, writing in Nature, called the theory wrong. Cognitive psychologist Steven Pinker, director of the MIT Department of Brain and Cognitive Sciences, wrote: "It makes a great story, but if you look at the contemporary records and autobiographies, it doesn't work that way."

In his 2009 book Judaism: A Way of Being, Gelernter wrote that God has withdrawn from the modern world, that Reform and Conservative Judaism do not work, that the purpose of life is to marry and rear a family, and that the feminist effort for male and female equality "is an act of aggression against both sanctity and humanity."

In his 2012 book America-Lite: How Imperial Academia Dismantled Our Culture (and Ushered in the Obamacrats), Gelernter argued that American higher education no longer cares about producing well-rounded and cultured students; academics instead believe that their role is to dictate how other Americans live and think. Scottish columnist Stephen Daisley wrote in Commentary magazine that Gelernter portrayed Obama's presidency as a symbol of the failure of American education and the success of its replacement with a liberal indoctrination system. As a solution, Gelernter proposed moving all of human knowledge to online servers so that the in-person college experience can be replaced by user-driven self-education. Daisley wrote,

America-Lite is lean, incisive, convincing, delightfully indelicate, and, in a break from the conventions of the literature on education, honest. It is a fine dissection—de-construction, if you must—of the corruption of higher education and the resulting debasement of political culture. If it makes its way on to a single college reading list, Hell will have frozen over.

— Stephen Daisley

Historian Russell Jacoby was critical in his review of Gelernter's book America-Lite, saying it contained insufficient arguments. Jacoby wrote that Gelernter blamed Jews for causing the breakdown of patriotism and the traditional family, writing, "Gelernter is Jewish, and it is not likely that a non-Jew would airily argue that obnoxious leftist Jews have taken over elite higher education."

== Selected works ==
=== Books ===
- With David Padua & Alexandru Nicolau. Languages and Compilers for Parallel Computing. Mass. Instit. of Tech. Pr., 1990.
- With Suresh Jagannathan. Programming Linguistics. Mass. Instit. of Tech., 1990.
- With Nicholas Carriero. How to Write Parallel Programs: A first course. Mass. Instit. of Tech. Pr., 1990.
- Mirror Worlds: or the Day Software Puts the Universe in a Shoebox...How It Will Happen and What It Will Mean. Oxford Univ. Pr., 1992.
- The Muse in the Machine: Computerizing the Poetry of Human Thought. MacMillan, Inc., 1994.
- 1939: The Lost World of the Fair. HarperCollins Pub., 1996.
- Drawing Life: Surviving the Unabomber. Simon & Schuster Adult Pub. Group, 1997.
- The Aesthetics of Computing. Phoenix (Orion Books Ltd, UK), 1998.
- Machine Beauty: Elegance and the Heart of Technology. Perseus Pub., 1998.
- Americanism: The Fourth Great Western Religion. Doubleday., 2007.
- Judaism: A Way of Being. Yale University Press, 2009.
- America-Lite: How Imperial Academia Dismantled Our Culture (and Ushered in the Obamacrats). Encounter Books, 2012, ISBN 978-1594036064
- The Tides of Mind: Uncovering the Spectrum of Consciousness. Liveright, 2016. W.W. Norton. ISBN 9781631492495

=== Articles ===
Gelernter has contributed to magazines such as City Journal, The Weekly Standard, and Commentary. For seven months, he contributed a weekly op-ed column to the Los Angeles Times. He has published in The Wall Street Journal, the New York Post, the Los Angeles Times, and the Frankfurter Allgemeine Zeitung.

- "Three programming systems and a computational 'model of everything'". in Peter J. Denning, ed., ACM's new Visions-of-computing Anthology, 2001.
- "Twentieth Century Machines". in R. Stolley, ed., Life Century of Change (2000).
- "Computers and the pursuit of happiness". Commentary, Dec. 2000.
- "Now that the PC is dead...,". The Wall Street Journal millennium issue, 2000.
- "Americanism – & Its Enemies", July–August 2004.
- "The Inside-Out Web". Forbes, April 2007.
- "Machines That Will Think and Feel: Artificial intelligence is still in its infancy—and that should scare us", The Wall Street Journal, March 18, 2016.
- "Giving up Darwin". in Claremont Review of Books, Volume XIX, Number 2, Spring 2019

== See also ==
- List of people named in the Epstein files

== Sources ==
- Boiskin, Asher; Gao, Jerry (February 2, 2026). "Yale Professor Wrote to Epstein About Women, Including Undergraduate". Yale Daily News.
- Chierchio, Sofia (February 5, 2026). "Yale Professor Defends 'goodlooking Blonde' Student Referral to Jeffrey Epstein". Forbes. Archived from the original on February 11, 2026.
- Gelernter, David (January 23, 2017). "Yale Professor Makes Case for Donald Trump Vote". The O’Reilly Factor (Interview). Interviewed by O'Reilly, Bill. Fox News.
- Kaplan, Thomas (January 29, 2007). "Unabomber's Act Still Affects Prof. Gelernter". Yale Daily News.
- Levy, Steven (May 21, 1995). "The Unabomber and David Gelernter". The New York Times. p. 50.
- Mangan, Dan (February 11, 2026). "Epstein Files: Yale Bars David Gelernter from Teaching Classes Amid Review of Emails". CNBC.
- "Barbara Reader Wed To David H. Gelernter". The New York Times. August 23, 1976.
- Nyberg, Leo (February 5, 2026). "Gelernter Tells Dean He Stands by Praising Student's Looks to Epstein". Yale Daily News.
- Nyberg, Leo; Boiskin, Asher; Gao, Jerry (February 10, 2026). "Gelernter Stops Teaching Amid Yale Review Over His Epstein Emails". Yale Daily News.
- Nyberg, Leo; Cowan, Corinne (February 4, 2026). "Professor Defends Emails With Epstein, Teaches After Crowd Gathers". Yale Daily News.
- Shallit, Jeffrey (August 2, 2019). "Recursivity: David Gelernter Makes a Fool of Himself Again". Blogger.
- "David Gelernter". Yale University. September 28, 2026. "David Gelernter is professor of computer science at Yale, chief scientist at Mirror Worlds Technologies, contributing editor at the Weekly Standard and member of the National Council of the Arts."
