= Maurice Donegan (Irish republican) =

Irish Major

Major Maurice Donegan
- Born: 23 April 1899; Bantry, County Cork
- Died: 22 August 1974 (aged 74–75); Bon Secours Hospital, Cork, County Cork
- Other name: Thomas Fitzpatrick
- Education: De La Salle College Waterford
- Military career
- Allegiance: Revolutionary Irish Republic; Irish Volunteers; Irish Republican Army; National Army
- Service years: 1917–1923
- Rank: Major
- Nickname: Mossie

Maurice Donegan (23 April 1899 – 22 August 1974) was an officer in the Irish Republican Army (IRA) during the Irish War of Independence, commanding the 5th Bantry Battalion of the Cork III Brigade. Following the Irish Civil War, he unsuccessfully contested the 1923 Irish general election as a candidate with Sinn Féin in the Cork West constituency.

== Early life ==
Maurice Donegan was born on 23 April 1899 and grew up in the town of Bantry. In 1917, aged 16, Donegan left Bantry to study national school teaching in De La Salle College Waterford. During the Conscription Crisis of 1918 Donegan returned to Bantry, undertaking Irish Volunteers training with Raphael Keyes. At this time Donegan was also involved with an Irish Volunteers training camp, held in Glandore in August 1919.

== War of Independence ==
On 17 November 1919, Donegan lead the Bantry Battalion of the Irish Republican Army in a raid on a British Army submarine chaser docked at Bantry railroad pier, which resulted in the seizure of ammunition and firearms by the IRA. This attack was aided by intelligence from locals who were working for the 'Princess Beara' steamship which moored at the same pier. The arms from the Bantry seizure were stored in the local Catholic church, St. Finbarrs. These weapons were later used by the West Cork Flying Column under the command of Tom Barry in the later Kilmichael Ambush.

On 28 March 1920, Ted Sullivan and Donegan organised an attack on a Royal Irish Constabulary barrack in the village of Durrus. Petrol was poured through the roof of the barracks and set alight along with mines being dropped through the roof also. After a number of RIC officers were injured, the barracks were closed.

On 3 August 1920, Donegan was involved in the raid on Mizen Head signal station along with 11 other local volunteers. The IRA commandeered a truck and drove it to Mizen. When they arrived, they entered the signal station and held the staff at gunpoint, disconnecting the phone lines and removing all explosives from storage at the station. These explosives were mainly made up of Tonite and Nitrocellulose.

On 23 August 1920, Donegan lead an ambush on a RIC patrol in the village of Glengarriff. He left Bantry by boat but due to engine troubles, arrived on Garnish Island at 4am. By this time Donegan and his accompanying troops were hungry and so entered a local home for a meal of sprats. When the IRA arrived in Glengarriff they occupied two points on the main street where they were engaged in gunfire with the RIC patrol. During this altercation a local man crossing the street was described to have had 'his jacket ripped off him' by the bullets passing through the air. Fatalities arising from this ambush led to the closure of the Glengarriff RIC barracks.

== Arrest and internment ==
The No. 1 Compound internee officer staff. Front Row (From Left to Right): Art O' Donnell, Mossie Donegan a.k.a. Thomas Fitzpatrick, Joseph McGrath, Dr. Richard Hayes, Dr. T F O' Higgins. Back Row: Thomas Meldon, Barney O' Driscoll, Thomas Treacy, D Hogan

On 3 December 1920, Donegan was arrested following his attendance of a mass while on the run. A British Army convoy approached the car containing Donegan and other IRA members, and fired upon them. Donegan was taken to Bantry Workhouse and was held there as a prisoner, before being moved to Collins Barracks, Cork via boat.

Donegan was removed from Cork and was taken by ship to Belfast where the prisoners were taken to Ballykinlar Internment Camp. While detained at Belfast Docks, members of the Orange Order gathered to beat the prisoners using iron bars.

While interned, Donegan used the name Thomas Fitzpatrick, to avoid identification. Donegan was a member of the camp council, an IRA branch operating within the camp. At one stage recording devices were discovered in the walls of common areas and so the council tied notes onto stones, relying on good aim to pass messages. The council undertook the construction of an escape tunnel, which upon discovery meant Donegan was extensively cross-examined.

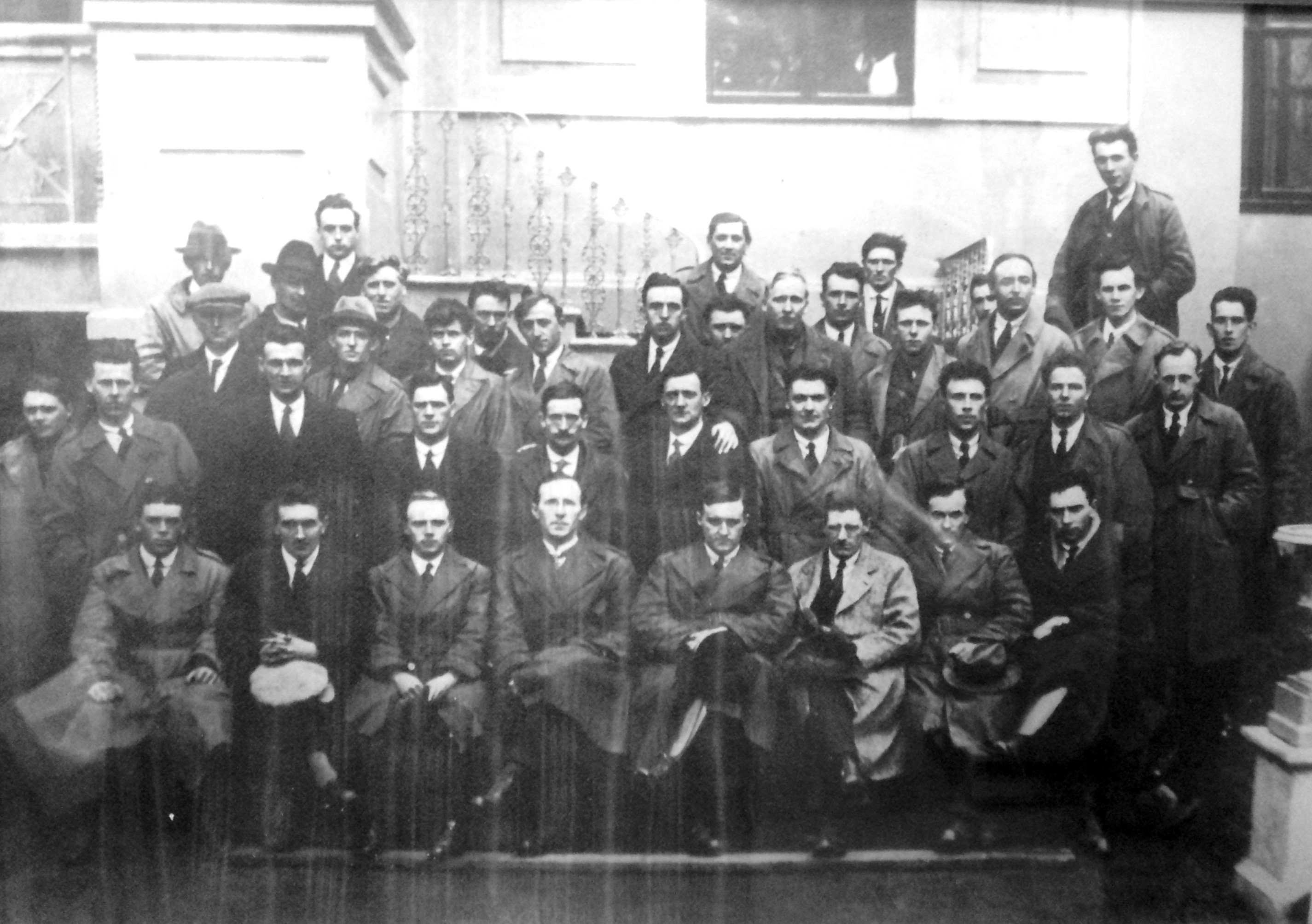
An Anti-Treaty IRA Convention at the Mansion House, Dublin held on 9 April 1922. Donegan is second from the right in the second row.

In October 1921, Donegan escaped from Ballykinlar Camp. A prisoner in the camp, Patrick Colgan, was given British military uniforms while being treated in the camp hospital. Donegan was admitted to the camp hospital for treatment with a fake illness. On 16 October, Donegan and Colgan dressed up two dummies in their camp uniform and placed them into their beds. Donegan and Colgan then proceeded to follow an officer out of the front gates of the camp while wearing Colgan's uniforms. Donegan and Colgan were arrested in Drogheda by the RIC, and were returned to Ballykinlar where they served six weeks solitary confinement while awaiting trial. They were court martialled in Belfast and sentenced to six months hard labour in Belfast Jail.

== 1923 General Election ==
Following the Irish Civil War, Donegan unsuccessfully contested the 1923 Irish general election as a candidate with Sinn Féin in the Cork West constituency.
