= Andrew Coulter Enright =

Andrew Enright

Andrew Coulter Enright is an American artist. He conceived the Cover Flow visual browsing computer interface purchased by Apple in 2006, for iTunes, Safari, and other products.

Enright wrote the 2003 book How to Be Fashionable or Consume Like Me, a satirical account of the New York hipster movement. He is currently employed by a commercial organization, but he produces art independently in various media and maintains a personal blog, The Treehouse and The Cave. He lives in New York City with his wife.
