= Kathy Sierra =

American technology writer

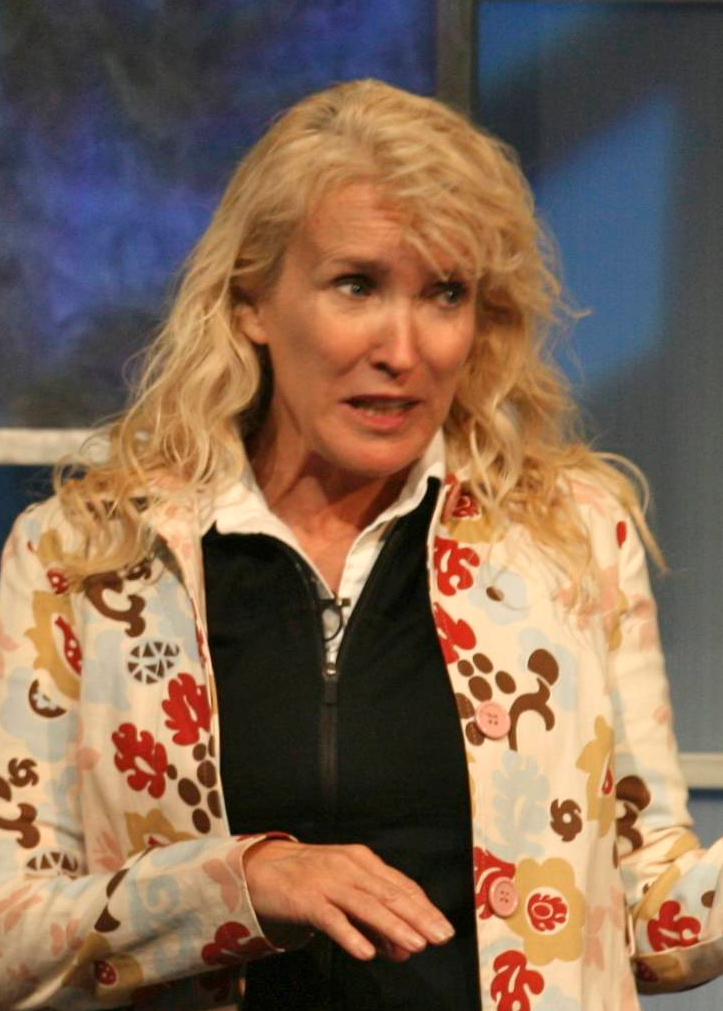
- Sierra speaking at eTech in 2008
- Education: Cal Poly San Luis Obispo, UCLA
- Occupations: Programming instructor, game developer

Kathy Sierra is an American programming instructor, game developer, author, and the curator of Intrinzen.

== Education and career ==
Sierra attended Cal Poly San Luis Obispo with a major in exercise physiology and spent 10 years working in the fitness industry. She changed careers after attending programming classes at UCLA, later returning to teach a course on "new media interactivity" for UCLA Extension. She led the new media team at Mind over Macintosh, a Los Angeles training center that provided training to advertising and entertainment corporations adapting digital technologies in the mid-1990s. She was the lead programmer on the computer games Terratopia, a 1998 children's adventure game released by Virgin Sound & Vision, and All Dogs Go to Heaven, a film-based game released as a free cereal premium by MGM. She also worked as a master trainer for Sun Microsystems, teaching Java instructors how to introduce new Java technologies and developing certification exams. In 1998, she founded the Java programmers' online community JavaRanch.

She is the co-creator of the Head First series of books on technical (primarily computer) topics, along with her partner, Bert Bates. The series, which began with Head First Java in 2003, takes an unorthodox, visually intensive approach to the process of teaching programming. Sierra's books in the series have received three nominations for Product Excellence Jolt Awards, winning in 2005 for Head First Design Patterns, and were recognized on Amazon.com's yearly top 10 list for computer books from 2003 to 2005. In 2005 she coined the phrase "The Kool-Aid Point" to describe the point at which detractors emerge purely due to the popularity of a topic being promoted by others.

Sierra says that her interest in cognitive science was motivated by her epilepsy, a condition for which she takes anti-seizure medication. "My interest in the brain began when I had my first grand mal seizure at the age of four," she wrote on her personal weblog.

After years of being mostly absent from the open internet, in July 2013 she started the site "Serious Pony" including a blog, together with a Twitter account, although as of October 2014 the latter had been deleted due to ongoing harassment.

== Harassment and withdrawal from online life ==
In 2007, Sierra became the target of online harassment over her support of moderating comments on the internet, which was seen by harassers as infringing on internet freedom. In March 2007, Sierra abruptly canceled her appearance at the O'Reilly Media ETech conference in San Diego due to threatening blog posts and emails, including death threats. Sierra's harassers posted doctored images of her face next to a noose or being strangled. The harassment increased after the threats were reported in the news. The hacker and self-professed "Internet troll" Andrew Auernheimer, known as weev, told the New York Times that he was responsible for posting false information about Sierra online, along with her address and Social Security number, a form of harassment known as doxing.

Sierra gave up her technology career as a result of the harassment, withdrawing from most public-speaking events and no longer blogging. In her final post, she wrote that she did not want to be involved with the culture of the blogosphere as long as such harassment was accepted. She later wrote, "I had no desire then to find out what comes after doxxing, especially not with a family".

The issue triggered public discussion on the concept of a bloggers' code of conduct. Some bloggers, including Robert Scoble, author of the technology blog Scobleizer, temporarily suspended their blogs in a show of support for Sierra. One of the larger issues Scoble felt was highlighted by the incident was online hostility to women: "It's this culture of attacking women that has especially got to stop," Scoble said "[W]henever I post a video of a female technologist there invariably are snide remarks about body parts and other things that simply wouldn't happen if the interviewee were a man."

== Selected publications ==
- Mike Meyers' Java 2 Certification Passport (McGraw-Hill Osborne, 2001) ISBN 0-07-219366-2
- Sun Certified Programmer & Developer for Java 2 Study Guide (McGraw-Hill Osborne, 2002) ISBN 0-07-222684-6
- Head First EJB (O'Reilly Publishing, 2003) ISBN 0-596-00571-7
- Head First Servlets and JSP (O'Reilly Publishing, 2004) ISBN 0-596-00540-7
- Head First Design Patterns (O'Reilly Publishing, 2004) ISBN 0-596-00712-4
- SCJP Sun Certified Programmer for Java 5 Study Guide (McGraw-Hill Osborne, 2005) ISBN 0-07-225360-6
- Head First Java (O'Reilly Publishing, 2005) ISBN 0-596-00920-8
- OCP Java SE 6 Programmer Practice Exams (Exam 310-065) (McGraw-Hill Osborne, 2010) ISBN 0-07-226088-2
- OCA/OCP Java SE 7 Programmer I & II Study Guide (Exams 1Z0-803 & 1Z0-804) McGraw-Hill 2014
- Badass: Making Users Awesome (O'Reilly Media, 2015) ISBN 1-4919-1901-9
- OCA Java SE 8 Programmer I Exam Guide (Exams 1Z0-808) 1st Edition McGraw-Hill 2017 ISBN 1-260-01139-9
- OCP Java SE 8 Programmer II Exam Guide (Exam 1Z0-809) 7th Edition McGraw-Hill 2018 ISBN 1-260-11738-3
