= Michael Morrison (author) =

American author, software developer, and toy inventor

Michael Wayne Morrison is an American author, software developer, and toy inventor. He is best known for his books on topics including Internet design and development, mobile device usage, and game programming.

Morrison's writing career began in the early 1990s and coincided with the release of the Java programming language. He embraced the Java technology and wrote and contributed to numerous Java books, as well as developing several online Java courses. His first book was actually Windows 95 Game Developer's Guide Using the Game SDK, which was the first book to explore and demystify Microsoft's new (at the time) DirectX game development technology. He co-authored his first book with his close friend and former college roommate, the late Randy Weems, who Morrison credits with a great deal of his technical knowledge. Morrison quickly followed up this book by serving as lead author of Java Unleashed, which quickly became a best-seller. He went on to write books on numerous Web-related technologies such as HTML, XML, CSS, and JavaScript, and also ventured into end-user writing by authoring books on Pocket PC, BlackBerry, and Treo handheld devices.

Morrison was born in Nashville, Tennessee. He has a B.A. from Tennessee Technological University in Electrical Engineering, although he credits the school with little beyond serving as the place where he met his wife and a handful of close friends.

== Bibliography ==
- Windows 95 Game Developer's Guide
- Java Unleashed
- Teach Yourself Internet Game Programming with Java in 21 Days
- Tricks of the Java Programming Gurus
- Presenting ActiveX
- Java Developer's Reference
- Teach Yourself Java in 21 Days Professional Reference Edition
- VBScript Web Page Interactivity
- Late Night Visual J++
- Presenting JavaBeans
- How to Program JavaBeans
- Java 1.1 Unleashed, 3rd Edition
- Microsoft Visual InterDev Unleashed
- Teach Yourself More Java in 21 Days
- Professional Edition Using HTML 4, XML, and Java 1.2
- Java 1.2 Class Libraries Unleashed
- The Complete Idiot's Guide to Java 2
- Teach Yourself MFC in 24 Hours
- MFC Programming with Visual C++ 6 Unleashed
- Teach Yourself DirectX 7 in 24 Hours
- Teach Yourself Windows Script Host in 21 Days
- XML Unleashed
- IE 5 Web Programming Unleashed
- Unauthorized Guide to Pocket PC
- Java 2 in Plain English
- Teach Yourself Wireless Java with J2ME in 21 Days
- HTML and XML for Beginners
- Teach Yourself XML in 24 Hours, 2nd Edition
- Special Edition Using Pocket PC 2002
- Teach Yourself SVG in 24 Hours
- Teach Yourself Game Programming in 24 Hours
- Faster Smarter HTML and XML
- Teach Yourself HTML and XHTML in 24 Hours, 6th Edition
- JavaScript Bible, 5th Edition
- Beginning Game Programming
- Beginning Mobile Phone Game Programming
- BlackBerry In a Snap
- Treo Essentials
- Teach Yourself XML in 24 Hours, 3rd Edition
- Teach Yourself HTML & CSS in 24 Hours
- Head First JavaScript
