= Joe Enright =

Irish footballer

Personal information
- Full name: Joseph Thomas Enright
- Date of birth: 16 May 1890
- Place of birth: Athlone, Ireland
- Height: 5 ft 7 in (1.70 m)
- Positions: Inside forward; outside forward

Senior career*
Years	Team	Apps	(Gls)
1908–1910	Shelbourne		
1910–1913	Leeds City	77	(23)
1913–1914	Newport County		
1914–1915	Coventry City	21	(8)
- Athlone Town

International career
1909	Irish League XI	2	(0)
1912	Ireland	1	(0)
- * Club domestic league appearances and goals

Joseph Thomas Enright was an Irish professional footballer who played as a forward in the Football League for Leeds City. He also played in the Southern League for Newport County and Coventry City and won an international cap for Ireland.

== Personal life ==
Enwright was born at home on Glasses Lane (now Griffith Street) in Athlone to Thomas Enright, a labourer, and Elizabeth Enright (née Garty). Enwright served in the Royal Army Ordnance Corps during the First World War. As of March 2014, his great nephew Chris Enright was on the staff at Athlone Town.

== Career statistics ==
Appearances and goals by club, season and competition
Club	Season	League			FA Cup		Total	
Club	Season	Division	Apps	Goals	Apps	Goals	Apps	Goals
Leeds City	1910–11	Second Division	37	10	1	0	38	10
Leeds City	1911–12	Second Division	34	12	2	0	36	12
Leeds City	1912–13	Second Division	6	1	0	0	6	1
Leeds City	Total		77	23	3	0	80	23
Coventry City	1914–15	Southern League Second Division	21	8	1	1	22	9
Career total			98	31	4	1	102	32
