= Political views of American academics =

The political views of American academics began to receive attention in the 1930s, and investigation into faculty political views expanded rapidly after the rise of McCarthyism. Demographic surveys of faculty that began in the 1950s and continue to the present have found higher percentages of liberals than of conservatives, particularly among those who work in the humanities and social sciences. Researchers and pundits disagree about survey methodology and about the interpretations of the findings.

== History ==
=== Pre- and post-WWII ===
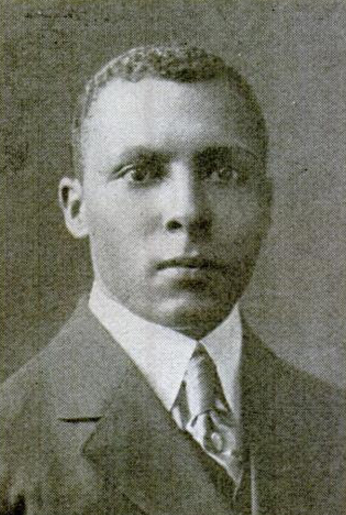
Max Yergan was one of the first professors fired for political views.

Carol Smith and Stephen Leberstein have documented investigations of professors' political views at the City College of New York (CCNY) during the 1930s and 1940s. Citing the tactics of private hearings, requiring respondents to name others, and denying rights of legal representation, Smith calls the investigations a "dress rehearsal for McCarthyism". Smith described the case of Max Yergan, who was the first African American professor hired at the CCNY. After complaints that he expressed liberal and progressive views in his classes on Negro History and Culture, Yergan was terminated in 1936. In 1938, the U.S. House of Representatives created the House Un-American Activities Committee; one of the committee's first actions was to attempt to investigate the political views of faculty in the New York public colleges.

In 1940, Bertrand Russell was denied employment as a philosophy professor at CCNY because of his political beliefs. That same year, the New York State Legislature created the Rapp-Coutert Committee, which held hearings in 1940–41 during which faculty accused of holding communist political beliefs were interrogated. More than 50 faculty and staff at CCNY resigned or were terminated as a result of the hearings. One professor, Morris Schappes, served a year in prison on perjury charges for refusing to name colleagues who may have been affiliated with the Communist party. Smith believes that the investigations caused the largest political purge on one campus in the history of the US.

In 1942, the Federal Bureau of Investigation (FBI), began investigating the political views of W.E.B. DuBois, an African American sociologist who taught at Atlanta University. The investigation centered on DuBois's 1940 autobiography, Dusk of Dawn. Although the investigation was dismissed, Atlanta University fired DuBois in 1943. Public outcry led the university to reinstate DuBois, but he retired in 1944. In 1949, the House Un-American Activities Committee summoned faculty members from the University of Washington, and three tenured faculty members were fired.

Public concern about the political opinions of college teachers intensified after World War II ended in 1945. Sociologists who were investigated by the FBI for their political beliefs during this period include Ernest Burgess, William Fielding Ogburn, Robert Staughton Lynd, Helen Lynd, E. Franklin Frazier, Pitirim A. Sorokin, Talcott Parsons, Herbert Blumer, Samuel Stouffer, C. Wright Mills, and Edwin H. Sutherland.

=== McCarthyism and loyalty oaths ===
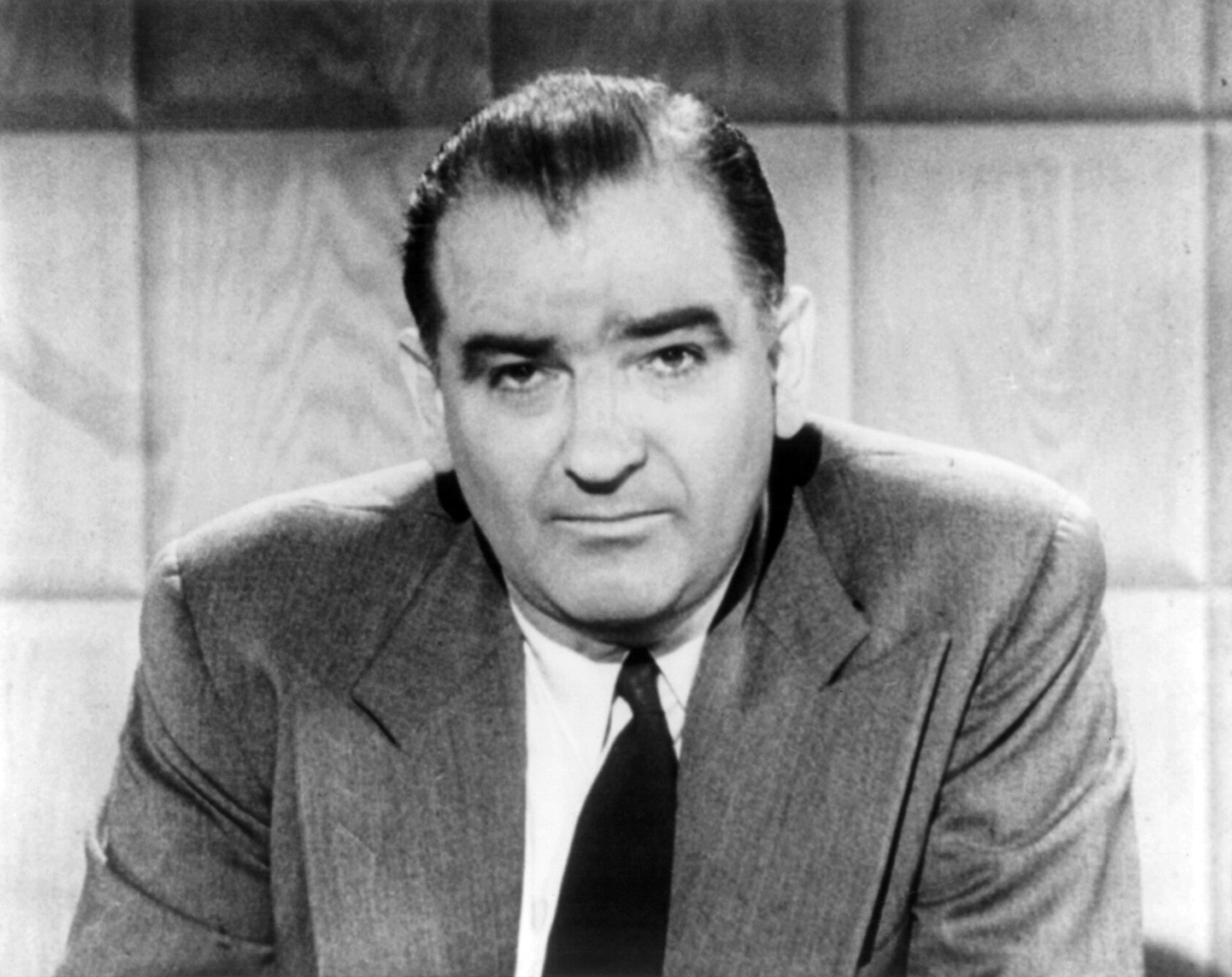
Joseph McCarthy's hearings led to faculty members being pressured to resign.

Although government employees and entertainment figures were most often investigated for alleged communist sympathies during the "Second Red Scare" of the 1950s, many university faculty were accused as well. In their 1955 study of 2,451 social scientists who taught at American colleges and universities, Lazarsfeld and Thielens noted that the period of 1945–55 was especially marked by suspicion and attacks on colleges for the political views of their faculty. These authors label this period "the difficult years."

In 1950, the University of California Board of Regents and its administration began to require faculty to sign a two-part political loyalty oath: one part required faculty to declare they were not Communists, and did not believe in the tenets of Communism; the other part was an oath of loyalty to the state of California and the US Constitution in accordance with the Levering Act. In early March, 1950, the faculty, who numbered 900, unanimously refused to sign even though the Regents threatened non-signers with termination. Faculty who refused to sign the loyalty oath were terminated, although most of the terminations were later overturned by a California state court. In 1951, members of the American Legion began accusing various university faculty of being communists. University administrations responded by banning left-wing student groups and communist speakers. Joseph McCarthy's Senate committee investigated 18 faculty members at Sarah Lawrence College, some of whom were pressured to resign.

According to historian Ellen Schrecker, "it is very clear that an academic blacklist was in operation during the McCarthy era." An estimated 100 university faculty were terminated during the McCarthy era due to suspicions about their political beliefs. In 1970, Federal Bureau of Investigation Director J. Edgar Hoover sent an open letter to US college students, advising them to reject leftist politics, and throughout the 1970s and 1980s, the FBI conducted a secret counterintelligence program in libraries.

== Surveys ==
=== Ford Foundation ===
In 1955, Robert Maynard Hutchins led an effort within the Ford Foundation to document and analyze the effects of McCarthyism on academic freedom. He commissioned sociologist Paul Lazarsfeld to conduct a study of university faculty in the United States, and the results were published by Lazarsfeld and Wagner Thielens in a book, The Academic Mind. As part of a survey of faculty views about academic freedom during the "Second Red Scare", they asked 2,451 professors of social science a large number of questions, and found that about two thirds of these faculty members had been visited by the FBI and had been asked questions about the political beliefs of their colleagues, students, and themselves. They also included a few questions about political party affiliations and recent voting patterns, and reported that there were more Democrats than Republicans, 47% to 16%. According to sociologist Neil Gross, the study was significant because it was the first effort to poll university faculty specifically about their political views.

=== Carnegie Commission on Higher Education ===
The Lazarsfeld and Thielens study had examined a sample of 2,451 social science faculty members. A second study, conducted in 1969 on behalf of the Carnegie Commission on Higher Education, was the first to be performed with a large survey sample, extensive questions about political views, and what Neil Gross characterized as highly rigorous analytic methods. The study was conducted in 1969 by political scientist Everett Carll Ladd and sociologist Seymour Martin Lipset, who surveyed 60,000 academics in multiple fields of study at 303 institutions about their political views. Publishing their results in the 1975 book The Divided Academy, Ladd and Lipset found that about 46% of professors described themselves as liberal, 27% described themselves as moderates, and 28% described themselves as conservative. They also reported that faculty in the humanities and social sciences tended to be the most liberal, while those in "applied professional schools such as nursing and home economics" and in agriculture were the most conservative. Younger faculty tended to be more liberal than older faculty, and faculty across the political spectrum tended to disapprove of the student activism of the 1960s.

Smaller follow-up surveys on behalf of the Carnegie Foundation held in 1975, 1984, 1989, and 1997 showed an increased trend among professors toward the left, apart from a small movement to the right in 1984. By the 1997 study, 57% of the professors surveyed identified as liberals, 20% as moderates, and 24% as conservatives.

=== Later surveys ===
As later surveys were published, some scholars pointed to the harmful effects of a political imbalance in the faculty, and one editorial described the effects as "ruining college". Other scholars said that there were serious methodological problems that led to overestimates of the disparity between liberals and conservatives, and that there were political motivations for such overestimates.

==== Higher Education Research Institute ====
Beginning in 1989, the Higher Education Research Institute (HERI) at the University of California, Los Angeles has conducted a survey of full-time faculty at American four-year colleges and universities every three years. The HERI Faculty Survey gathers comprehensive information about the faculty experience, such as position, field, institutional details, and personal opinion and views, including a single question asking respondents to self-identify their political orientation as "far left", "liberal", "moderate/middle of the road", "conservative", or "far right". Between 1989 and 1998, the survey showed negligible change in the number of professors who described themselves as far left or liberal, approximately 45%. As of 2014, surveying 16,112 professors, the percentage of liberal/far left had increased to 60%. When asked in 2012 about the significance of the findings on political views, the director of HERI, Sylvia Hurtado, said that the numbers on political views attract a lot of attention, but that this attention may be misplaced because there may be trivial reasons for the shifts.

==== North American Academic Survey Study ====
Ladd and Lipset, who had conducted the original Carnegie survey, designed a telephone survey in 1999 of approximately 4000 faculty, administrators, and students, called the North American Academic Survey Study (NAASS). The survey found the ratio of those identifying themselves as Democrat to those identifying as Republican to be 12 to 1 in the humanities, and 6.5 to 1 in the social sciences. Stanley Rothman, the project lead after the passing of Ladd and Lipset, published a paper using NAASS data along with Neil Nevitte and S. Robert Lichter which concluded "complaints of ideologically-based discrimination in academic advancement deserve serious consideration and further study". Rothman along with co-authors Matthew Woessner and April Kelly-Woessner reported their extended findings in a book titled The Still Divided Academy.

==== Politics of the American Professoriate ====
Neil Gross and Solon Simmons conducted a survey starting in 2006 called the Politics of the American Professoriate which led to several study papers and books. They designed their survey to improve on past studies which they felt had not included community college professors, addressed low response rates, or used standardized questions. The survey drew upon a sample size of 1417 full-time professors from 927 institutions.

In 2007, Gross and Simmons concluded in The Social and Political Views of American Professors that the professors were 44% liberal, 46% moderates, and 9% conservative. Inside Higher Ed reported that economist Lawrence H. Summers made his own analysis of the data collected by Gross and Simmons and found a larger gap among faculty teaching "core disciplines for undergraduate education" at selective research universities, but the report also concluded that "there was widespread praise for the way the survey was conducted, with Summers and others predicting that their data may become the definitive source for understanding professors' political views."

Gross published a more extensive analysis in his 2013 book Why Are Professors Liberal and Why Do Conservatives Care? and, with Simmons, in their 2014 compilation Professors and Their Politics. They strongly criticized what they saw as conservative political influence on the interpretation of data about faculty political views, arising from activists and think tanks seeking political reform of American higher education. Sociologist Joseph Hermanowicz described Professors and Their Politics as "a welcome addition to sociological literature examining higher education, which, in the case of its intersection with politics, has not received serious attention since Paul Lazarsfeld and Wagner Theilen's classic study of 1958 and Seymour Martin Lipset and Everett Carll Ladd's 1976 work."

==== Regional and disciplinary variations ====
Several studies have found that the political views of academics vary considerably between different regions of the United States, and between academic disciplines. In a 2016 opinion column in The New York Times, for example, political scientist Samuel J. Abrams used HERI data to argue that the ratio of liberal to conservative faculty varied greatly between regions. According to Abrams, the ratio of liberal to conservative professors was highest in New England, where this ratio was 28:1, compared to 6:1 nationally. Abrams also commented on these findings that "This previously unspecified ideological imbalance on campuses has led to cries of discrimination against right of center professors and scores of reports from both academic and popular press sources which have chronicled the concerns with this "beleaguered" and "oppressed" minority on campus... The data clearly reveal that conservative faculty are not only as satisfied with their career choice – if not more so – as their liberal counterparts, but that these faculty are also as progressive in their teaching methods and maintain almost identical outlooks toward their personal and professional lives."

Mitchell Langbert examined variations in political party registration in 2018, describing a higher concentration of Democrats in elite liberal arts institutions in the northeast, and found more Democrats among female faculty than male faculty. He also found the greatest ratio of Democrats to Republicans in interdisciplinary studies and the humanities, and the lowest ratio in professional studies and science and engineering.

Focusing specifically on social psychology academics, a 2014 study found that as of 2006, Democrats outnumbered Republicans by a ratio of 11:1. Russell Jacoby questioned the focus of the study on the social sciences rather than STEM fields saying that the "reason is obvious: Liberals do not outnumber conservatives in many of those disciplines".

== Effects ==
=== On research ===
A 2020 study asked participants to read the abstract of 194 psychology papers and judge which political side (if any) the findings seemed to support. The researchers found no relationship between perceived political slant and replicability, impact factor, or the quality of the research design. They did however find modest evidence that research with a greater perceived political slant — whether liberal or conservative — was less replicable.

=== On students ===
Since the modern conservative movement in the United States began in the mid-20th century, some conservative authors have argued that college students are no longer taught how to think, but what to think, as a result of the domination of far-left faculty. William F. Buckley's God and Man at Yale: The Superstitions of "Academic Freedom", Allan Bloom's The Closing of the American Mind, Dinesh D'Souza's Illiberal Education, and Roger Kimball's Tenured Radicals have made such arguments.

George Yancey argues that there is little evidence that the political orientation of faculty members affects the political attitudes of their students. A study by Mack D. Mariani and Gordon J. Hewitt published in 2008 examined ideological changes in college students between their first and senior years and found that these changes correlated with that of most Americans between the ages of 18 and 24 during the same time period, and there was no evidence that faculty ideology was "associated with changes in students' ideological orientation" and concluded that students at more liberal schools "were not statistically more likely to move to the left" than students at other institutions. Similarly, Stanley Rothman, April Kelly-Woessner, and Mathew Wossner found in 2010 that students' "aggregate attitudes do not appear to vary much between their first and final years," and wrote that this "raises some questions about charges that campuses politically indoctrinate students." Analysis of a survey of students' political attitudes by M. Kent Jennings and Laura Stoker found that the tendency of college graduates to be more liberal is largely due to "the fact that more liberal students are more likely to go to college in the first place."

According to a 2020 study, there is regression to the mean effect among individuals who go to college. Both left-wing and right-wing students become more moderate during their time in college.

=== On faculty ===
Rothman, Kelly-Woessner, and Woessner also found in 2010 that 33% of conservative faculty say they are "very satisfied" with their careers, while 24% of liberal faculty say so. Over 90% of Republican-voting professors said that they would still become professors if they could do it all over again. The authors concluded that, although such numbers are not definitive as to how faculty members feel that they have been treated, they provide some evidence against the idea that conservative faculty members are systematically discriminated against. Woessner and Kelly-Woessner also examined what might have given rise to the differences in the numbers of liberals and conservatives. They looked at the choices made by undergraduate students when planning future careers. They found that there were no differences in intellectual ability between conservative and liberal students, but that liberal students were significantly more likely to choose to pursue PhD degrees and academic careers, whereas conservative students of identical academic accomplishments were more likely to pursue business careers. They concluded that the greater numbers of liberal than conservative professors could be accounted for by self-selection in career paths, rather than by bias in hiring or promotion.

Lawrence Summers has said: "As someone who is a strong Democrat and is a liberal, and does not think that we have won the argument with the country over the last 40 years, rather to the contrary, it makes me wonder whether if you do not engage in intense dialogue with those whom you disagree with... whether your own arguments will be sharpened and honed to maximum effect."

Summers said at a symposium about The Social and Political Views of American Professors that he considers it a problem that some academics express an "extreme hostility" to conservative opinions. He observed that faculty who were invited to give Tanner Lectures on Human Values were almost always liberals, and expressed concern that an imbalance in political representation at universities could impede rigorous examination of issues. He also attributed the small numbers of conservative professors largely to the career choices made by people comparing academic careers with other options.

One outcome of these controversies was the founding of the Heterodox Academy in 2015, a bipartisan organization of professors seeking to increase the acceptance of diverse political viewpoints in academic discourse. As of February 2018, over 1500 college professors had joined Heterodox Academy. The group publishes a ranking which rates the top 150 universities in the United States based on their commitment to diversity of viewpoint.

Jon Shields and Joshua Dunn surveyed 153 conservative professors for their 2016 study Passing on the Right: Conservative Professors in the Progressive University. The authors wrote that these professors sometimes have to use "coping strategies that gays and lesbians have used in the military and other inhospitable work environments" in order to preserve their political identity. One tactic used by about one-third of the professors was to "pass" (or pretend) to hold liberal views around their colleagues. Shields stated his view that the populist right may overstate the bias that does exist and that conservatives can succeed using mechanisms like academic tenure to protect their freedom.

== See also ==
- Academic bias
- Media bias
- Political issues in higher education in the United States
- Political correctness in education
