= Gerry Enright =

Irish Gaelic footballer

Personal information
- Native name: Gearóid Mac Ionnrachtaigh (Irish)
- Born: 1966 (age 59–60) Cahir, County Tipperary, Ireland

Sport
- Sport: Gaelic football
- Position: Goalkeeper
Club
- Years: Club
- Cahir
Club titles
- Tipperary titles: 0
Inter-county
- Years: County
- 1986-1993: Tipperary
Inter-county titles
- Munster titles: 0
- All-Irelands: 0
- NFL: 0
- All Stars: 0

Gerry Enright (born 1966) is an Irish Gaelic footballer who plays as a goalkeeper for the Tipperary senior team.

Born in Cahir, County Tipperary, Enright first arrived on the inter-county scene at the age of sixteen when he first linked up with the Tipperary minor team before later joining the under-21 side. Enright joined the senior panel during the 1986 championship.

At club level Enright played with Cahir.

He retired from inter-county football following the conclusion of the 2003 championship.

== Honours ==
=== Player ===
Tipperary

- McGrath Cup (1): 1989
- Munster Minor Football Championship (1): 1984
