= Eric Freeman (writer) =

American computer scientist

- Occupation(s): Computer scientist, author
- Known for: Lifestreaming
- Website: ericfreeman.com

Eric Freeman is a computer scientist, author and constituent of David Gelernter on the Lifestreaming concept.

== Authored works ==
Eric Freeman has publishing accolades for Head First HTML and CSS (ISBN 978-0596159900) which he co-authored with Elisabeth Robson, and Head First Design Patterns (ISBN 0-596-00712-4) also co-authored with Elisabeth Robson, Kathy Sierra and Bert Bates.
