= Michael Enright =

Michael Enright may refer to:

- Michael Enright (actor) (born c. 1964), British actor
- Michael Enright (broadcaster) (born 1943), Canadian radio broadcaster
- Michael Enright (politician) (1952–1997), Irish Democratic Left politician, briefly a senator
