= Paddy Enright =

Irish hurler (1926–2009)

Personal information
- Native name: Pádraig Mac Ionnrachtaigh (Irish)
- Born: 11 April 1926 Ahane, County Limerick, Ireland
- Died: 12 October 2009 (aged 83) Annacotty, County Limerick, Ireland
- Occupation: Freight Manager CIÉ employee

Sport
- Sport: Hurling
- Position: Full-back
Club
- Years: Club
- Ahane
Club titles
- Limerick titles: 1
Inter-county*
Years	County	Apps (scores)
1952–1956	Limerick	7 (0-00)
Inter-county titles
- Munster titles: 1
- All-Irelands: 0
- NHL: 0
- *Inter County team apps and scores correct as of 18:10, 16 February 2015.

Patrick Enright (11 April 1926 – 12 October 2009) was an Irish hurler who played as a full-back for the Limerick senior team.

Enright was a stalwart of the Limerick team throughout the 1950s. During that time he won one Munster winners' medal.

At club level, Enright won a club championship winners' medal with his local Ahane club.
