= Marlene Enright =

Irish singer-songwriter from County Cork

- Birth name: Marlene Enright
- Born: 1985 (age 39–40); Ireland
- Origin: Bantry
- Genres: alternative pop; Dream pop; R&B; Americana
- Occupation: Singer-songwriter
- Years active: 2012–present
- Website: marleneenright.com

Marlene Enright (born 1985) is an Irish singer-songwriter from County Cork.

== Early life ==
Marlene Enright is a native of Bantry.

== Career ==
Marlene Enright began as part of the Cork folk/Americana group The Hard Ground. Her debut solo album was released in 2017 and was nominated for the Choice Music Prize. Her voice has been described as mezzo-soprano.

== Discography ==
Studio albums

- Placemats and Second Cuts (2017)
