= West Cork =

Region of County Cork, Ireland

Coordinates: 51.6884°N 9.1434°W

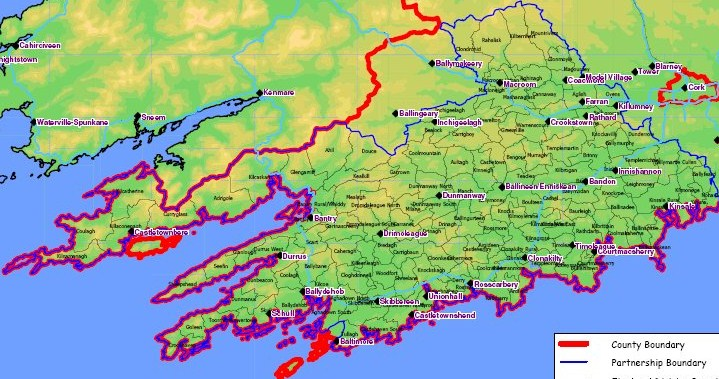
Map of West Cork

West Cork (Irish: Iarthar Chorcaí) is a tourist region and municipal district in County Cork, Ireland. As a municipal district, West Cork falls within the administrative area of Cork County Council, and includes the towns of Bantry, Castletownbere, Clonakilty, Dunmanway, Schull and Skibbereen, and the 'key villages' of Baltimore, Ballydehob, Courtmacsherry, Drimoleague, Durrus, Glengarriff, Leap, Rosscarbery, Timoleague and Union Hall.

The westernmost part of the region consists of three main peninsulas: Beara, Sheep's Head and Mizen Head. Islands which lie off West Cork include Bere Island, Sherkin Island and Cape Clear.

== History and administration ==
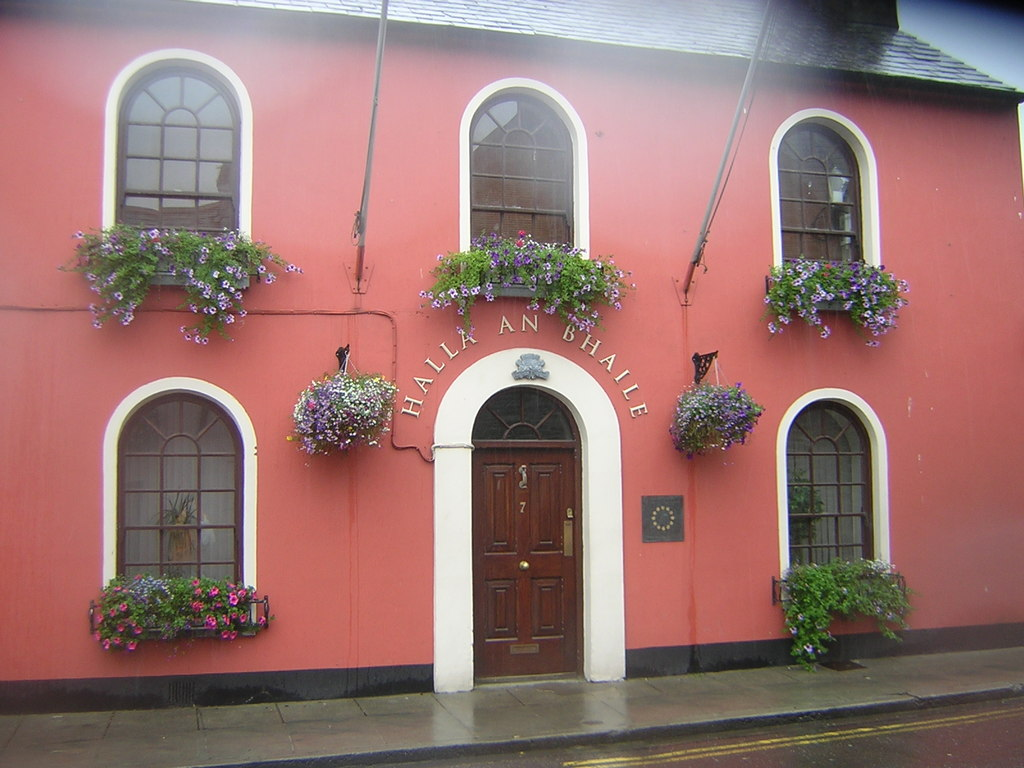
Clonakilty's town hall houses the council offices for the West Cork Municipal District

The area's pre-history is evident in the many Iron Age burial monuments, including a large number of megalithic tombs, dolmens, standing stones and stone circles.

West Cork has had a distinct identity from at least the ancient Dáirine kingdom of Corcu Loígde which once covered much of the area. The historic baronies of Carbery, the largest barony in Ireland down to the nineteenth-century, Bantry, and Bear, or Bere, on Beara Peninsula, existed down from the Middle Ages. A series of coastal islands, on the coast of the baronies of Carbery West and Carbery East, are known as Carbery's Hundred Isles.

A Spanish expedition made landfall on the coast in October 1601 attempting to link up with Irish rebels. This ended with the Battle of Kinsale - described as "one of the decisive battles of the world's history. If the Irish had won that battle—and they could have won it—...England's power was shattered". In the early 17th century, the townland of Leamcon (near Schull was a pirate stronghold, and pirates traded easily in Baltimore and Whiddy Island.

During the mid-19th century, parts of West Cork were severely impacted by the Great Famine.

Within the Catholic Church in Ireland and the Church of Ireland (Anglican) traditions, the coastal area from Ballydehob to Timoleague was formerly contained within the Dioceses of Ross. These dioceses no longer exist separately, and now form part of the larger Roman Catholic Diocese of Cork and Ross and the Church of Ireland Diocese of Cork, Cloyne and Ross respectively.

As of the 21st century, West Cork is a municipal district within the administrative area of Cork County Council. The district is represented by 9 councillors, and the West Cork Municipal District Office is in Clonakilty. In 2016, representatives of the Municipal District of West Cork signed a "twinning" agreement with the town of Scituate, Massachusetts.

== Geography ==
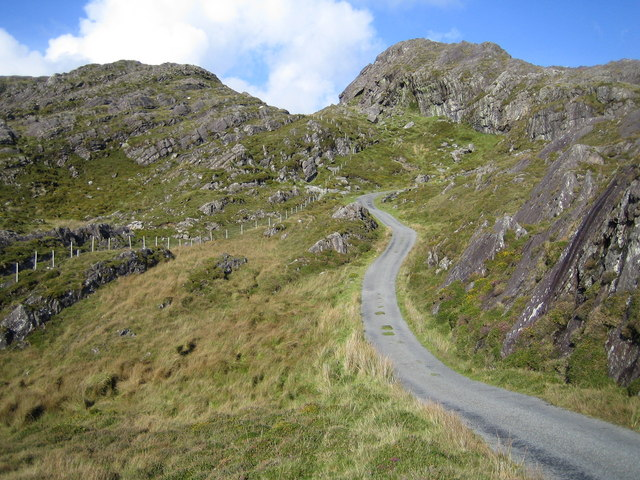
The Beara pass, through the Slieve Miskish mountains

The region's western terrain was formed between 360 and 374 million years ago, as part of the rising of the MacGillycuddy's Reeks and Caha Mountains mountains ranges. This occurred during the Devonian period when Ireland was part of a larger continental landmass and located south of the equator. There are three main peninsulas on this side of the region: Beara, Sheep's Head and Mizen Head.

Towns in West Cork include Ballydehob, Bandon, Bantry, Castletownbere, Clonakilty, Dunmanway, Rosscarbery, Schull, and Skibbereen.

== Transport ==
The area was linked in 1849 by the Cork, Bandon and South Coast Railway, sometimes known as the West Cork Railway. This railway line began in Cork City, travelled across the county and had branches to Clonakilty (junction at Gaggin) and Skibbereen (junction at Drimoleague), before terminating at Bantry. It closed in 1961. The narrow-gauge Schull and Skibbereen Railway opened in 1886 and closed in 1947.

The main infrastructural backbone is provided by the N71 and R586 routes.

The area is also served by bus, with routes offered by both Bus Eiréann and West Cork Connect.

== Tourism ==
Traditionally a tourist destination, the West Cork area is marketed to tourists for its remote peninsulas (such as the Beara Peninsula, Sheep's Head and Mizen Head peninsulas), beaches such as Inchydoney, Owenahincha and Barleycove, and towns and villages such as Skibbereen, Clonakilty, Kinsale and Rosscarbery. For tourism purposes, the area of West Cork is not strictly defined, but at its broadest definition it includes all parts of County Cork south and west of the River Lee with the exception of Cork city and suburbs. Road signs may be found around Cork city and elsewhere directing traffic for "The West" or "West Cork".

The Wild Atlantic Way tourist route spans much of the West Cork coast, including the Old Head of Kinsale, Dursey Island and Mizen Head.

== Gallery ==
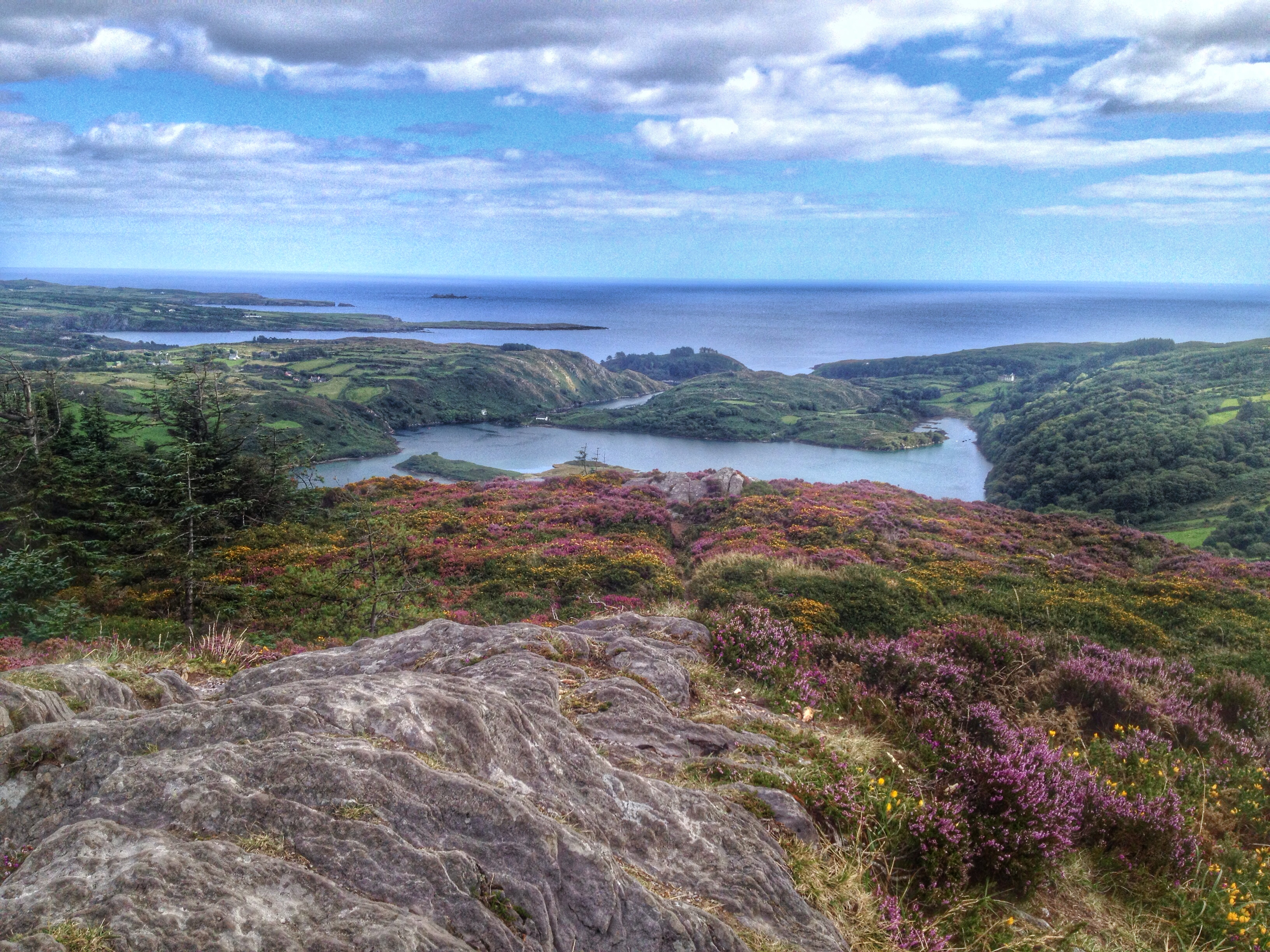
Lough Hyne, outside Skibbereen

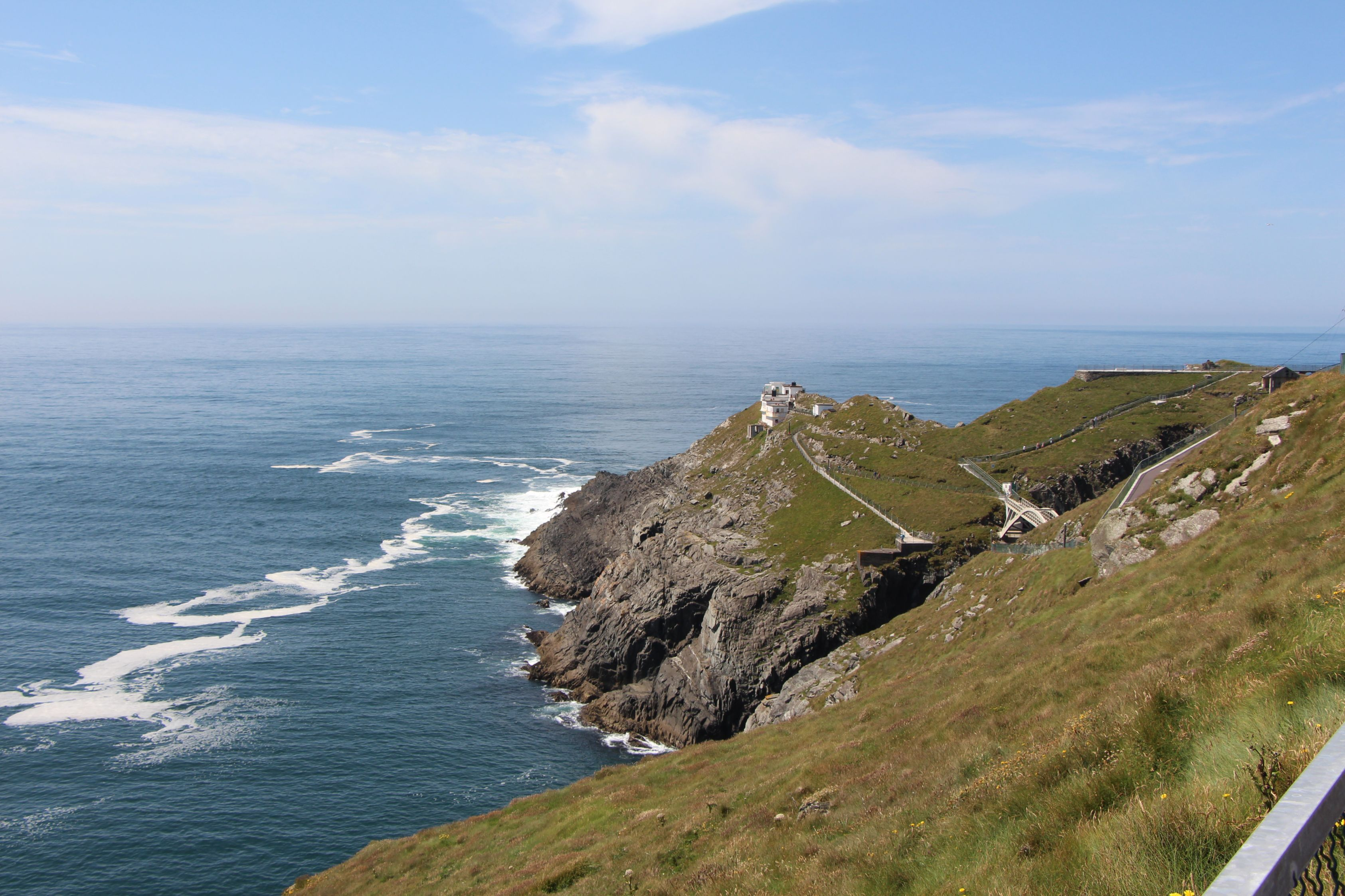
Mizen Head, the most southwesterly point of Ireland

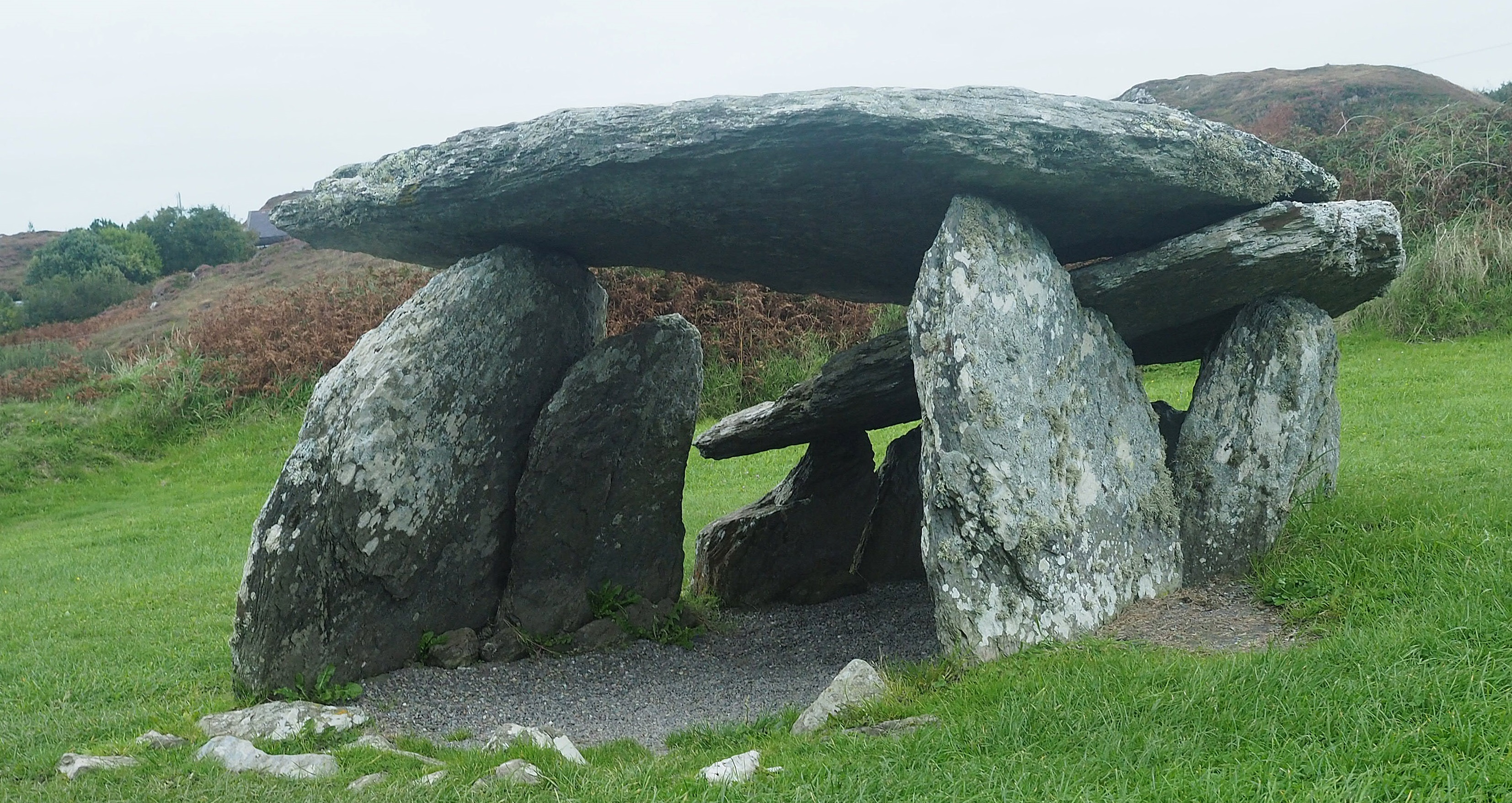
Altar Wedge Tomb, (c. 3000–2000 BC), Toormore Bay, outside Schull

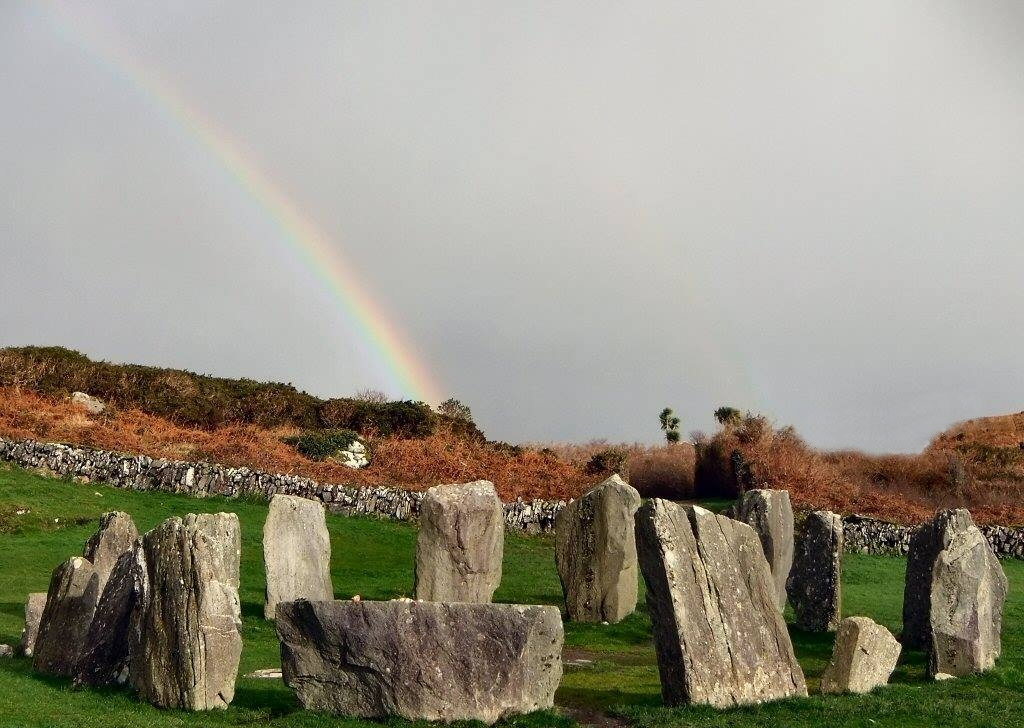
Drombeg stone circle, near Glandore. Active c. 1100 - 800 BC

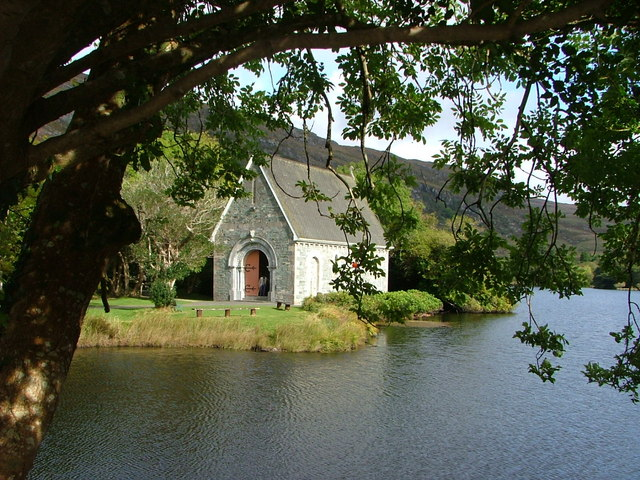
Gougane Barra, 6th century Christian monastery site near the source of the River Lee

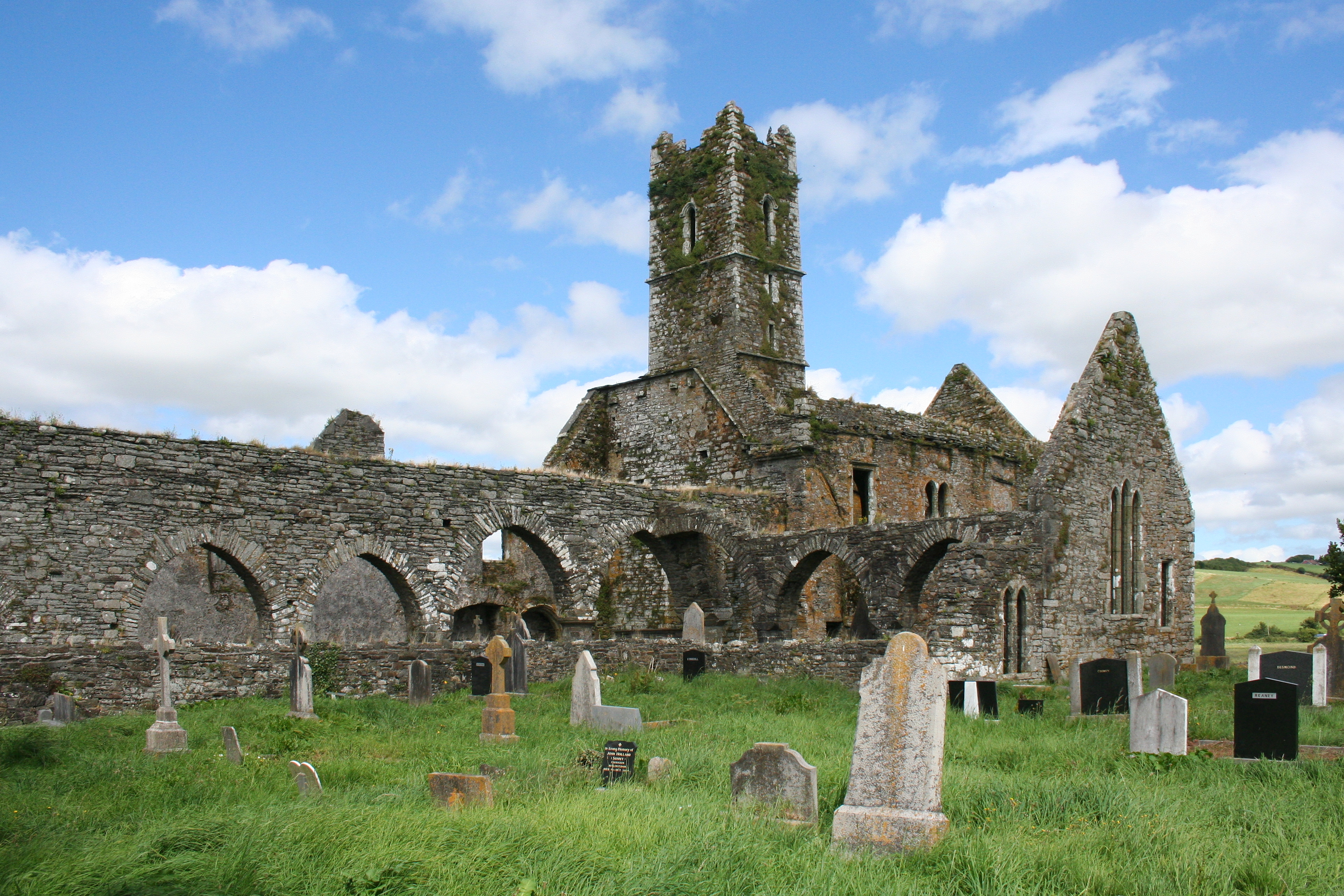
Timoleague Friary, founded in the 13th century

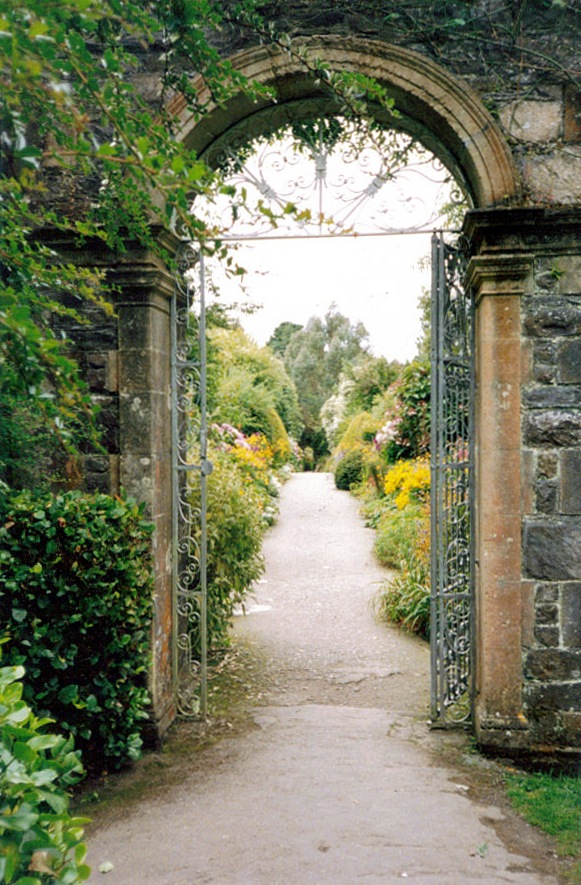
Garden on Garnish Island

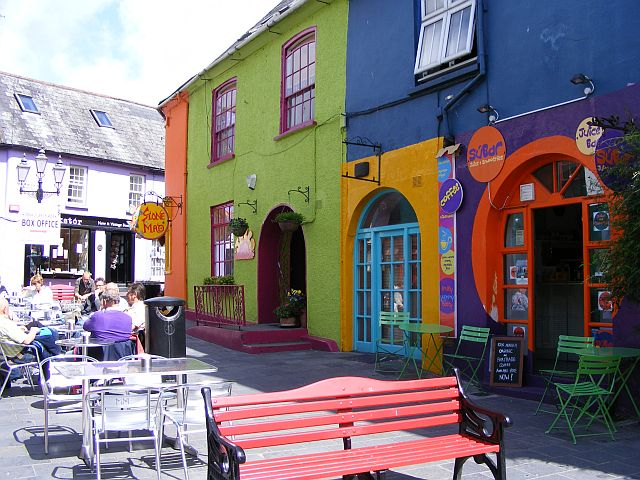
Street in Kinsale
