= Bear (barony) =

Barony in County Cork, Ireland

Bear (or Bere; Irish: Béarra) is a barony in the most westerly part of County Cork, Ireland. It comprises approximately two thirds of the Beara peninsula from the western tip along the whole northern shore part of Bantry bay to Glengariff. The remaining third to the north-east is the neighbouring barony of Glanarought in County Kerry. The barony's only other neighbour is that of Bantry to the east. To the north, it is bounded by the Kenmare River

== Legal context ==
Baronies were created after the Norman invasion of Ireland as divisions of counties and were used the administration of justice and the raising of revenue. While baronies continue to be officially defined units, they have been administratively obsolete since 1898. However, they continue to be used in land registration and in specification, such as in planning permissions. In many cases, a barony corresponds to an earlier Gaelic túath which had submitted to the Crown.

== Settlements ==
It induces the town of Castletownbere and settlements of Allihies, Eyeries, Ardgroom, Adrigole, Glengarriff and Rerrin.

== Civil parishes ==
The barony includes the whole of three civil parishes (Kilcatherine, Killaconenagh and Kilnamanagh) and part of a fourth (Kilcaskan).

== Geography ==
- Garnish Island
- Hungry Hill
- Dursey Island
- Bere Island
