= Knockoura =

Mountain in Ireland

- Cnoc Cumhra
- Location within island of Ireland

Highest point
- Elevation: 490 m (1,610 ft)
- Prominence: 395 m (1,296 ft)
- Listing: Marilyn
- Coordinates: 51.652°N 9.993°W

Geography
- Location: County Cork, Ireland
- Parent range: Slieve Miskish Mountains
- OSI/OSNI grid: V621462

Knockoura (Irish: Cnoc Cumhra) is a mountain on the Beara Peninsula in County Cork, Ireland.

== Geography ==
At an elevation of 490 metres Knockoura is one of the Irish Hang Gliding & Paragliding (IHPA) sites as well as being a site for 4 communications masts for telephone, TV, VHF, coastguard and WiMax antennas.

== See also ==
- List of Marilyns in Ireland
