= Bantry (County Cork barony) =

Barony in western County Cork, Ireland

Coordinates: 51.7411°N 9.3969°W

Bantry (Irish: Beanntraí) (Note: Bantry) is a barony in the west of County Cork in Ireland. Patrick Weston Joyce said the name Beanntraí means "descendants of Beann [Ban]", a son of Conchobar mac Nessa; similarly for the Wexford barony of Bantry. The barony borders the top end the southern shore of Bantry Bay. On the opposite shore is the barony of Bear. It is also bordered by Carbery West (West Division to the south and East Division to the southeast) and Muskerry West to the northeast. To the north is County Kerry.

== Legal context ==
Baronies were created after the Anglo-Norman invasion of Ireland as divisions of counties and were used the administration of justice and the raising of revenue. While baronies continue to be officially defined units, they have been administratively obsolete since 1898. However, they continue to be used in land registration and in specification, such as in planning permissions. In many cases, a barony corresponds to an earlier Gaelic túath which had submitted to the Crown.

== Settlements ==
Settlements include the town of Bantry (Note: Bantry: towns) and Ballylickey (Note: Bantry: population centres) and Kealkill.

== Geography ==
- Whiddy Island (Note: Bantry: islands and archipelagos)

== See also ==
- List of civil parishes of County Cork
- List of townlands of the barony of Bantry in County Cork
