= Keith Harrington =

Irish hurler

Personal information
- Born: Kilgarvan, County Kerry

Sport
- Sport: Hurling
- Position: Forward
Club
- Years: Club
- 2000's: Kilgarvan
Inter-county
- Years: County
- 2000's: Kerry
Inter-county titles
- Munster titles: 2
- All-Irelands: 0

Keith Harrington is an Irish hurler who plays with Kerry, South Kerry and Kilgarvan.
