= Ardgroom =

Village in County Cork, Ireland

Ardgroom Dhá Dhrom
- Village
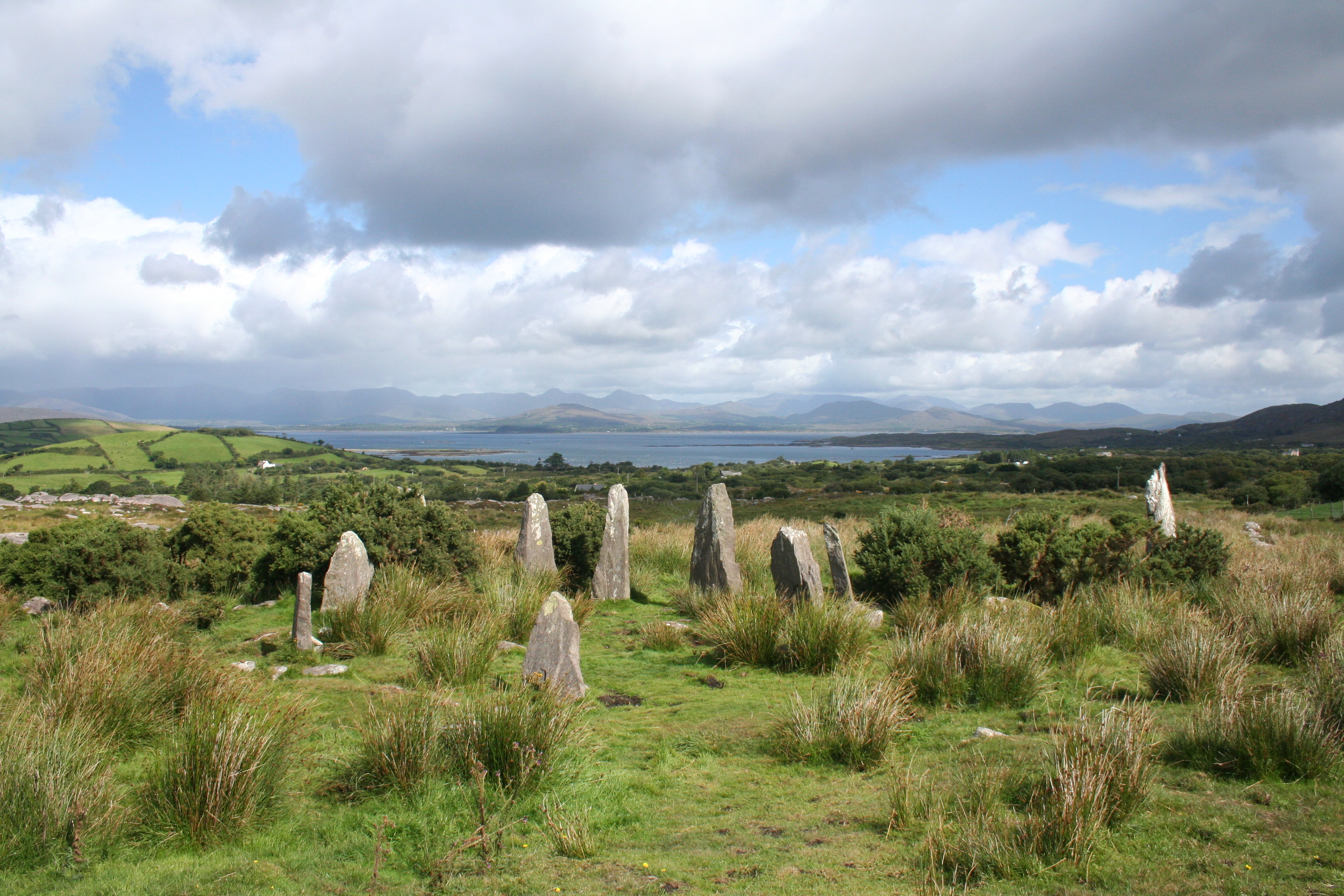
- "Ardgroom SW" ("Canfea") stone circle

- Location in Ireland
- Coordinates: 51.7343°N 9.8969°W
- Country: Ireland
- Province: Munster
- County: County Cork
- Time zone: UTC+0 (WET)
  - Summer (DST): UTC-1 (IST (WEST))
- Irish grid reference: V690553

Ardgroom (Irish: Dhá Dhrom, meaning 'two drumlins') is a village on the Beara peninsula in County Cork, Ireland. Its name refers to two gravelly hills deposited by a glacier, Dromárd and Drombeg. It lies to the north west of Glenbeg Lough, overlooking the Kenmare River estuary. It sits between the coast and the Slieve Miskish Mountains. The village contains a shop, post office, a petrol station and "The Village Inn" pub.

== Stone circle ==
Near the village lie a number of megalithic monuments. Signposted is the stone circle to be found to the east of the village at a distance of about 1 mile, off the old Kenmare road. It has the name "Canfea" but is normally called the "Ardgroom" stone circle. About 1 mile north east lie the remains of another stone circle.

The circle consists of 11 stones, 9 of which are still upright with one alignment stone outside the circle. Unusually for a stone circle, its stones tend to taper toward points.

Also in the vicinity are the remains of at least two ring forts and a number of standing stones and stone rows.
