= Glanarought =

Barony in County Kerry, Ireland

Glanarought Gleann Ó Ruachta (Irish)
- Barony
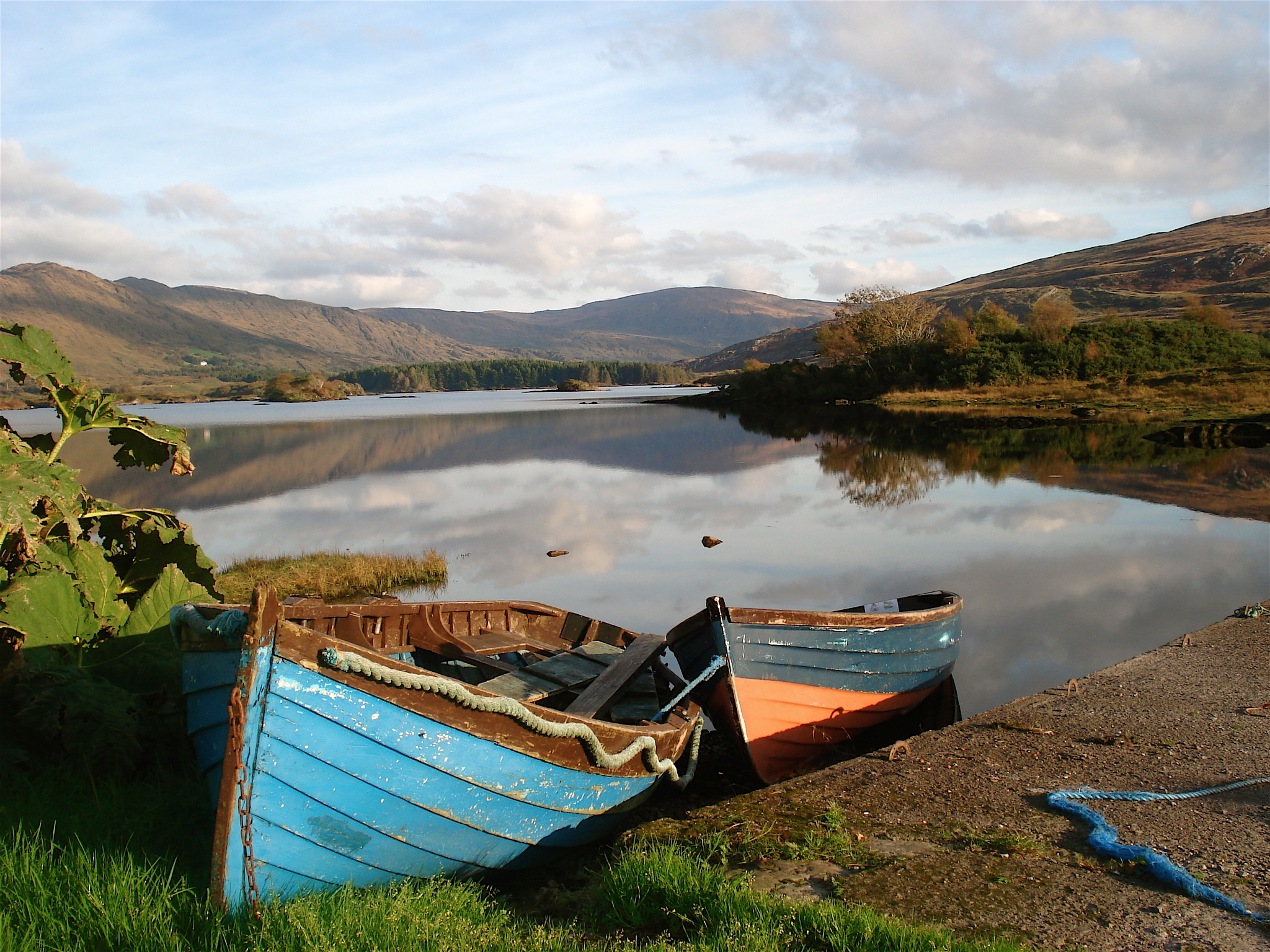
- View of Cloonee Loughs

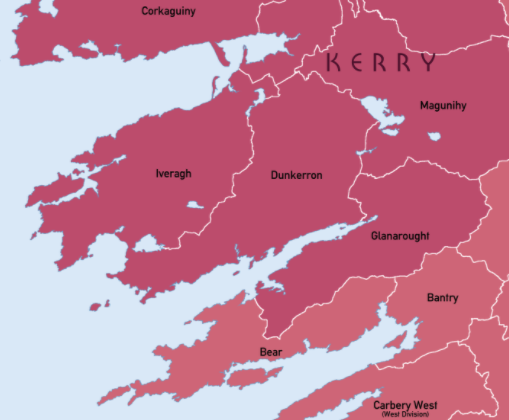
- Barony map of County Kerry, 1900; Glanarought barony is in the south.

- Location within Ireland
- Coordinates: 51°49′N 9°42′W
- Sovereign state: Ireland
- Province: Munster
- County: Kerry

Area
  - Total: 493.2 km^{2} (190.4 sq mi)

Glanarought (Irish: Gleann Ó Ruachta) is a historical barony in southern County Kerry, Ireland.

Baronies were mainly cadastral rather than administrative units. They acquired modest local taxation and spending functions in the 19th century before being superseded by the Local Government (Ireland) Act 1898.

== History ==
The name Glanarought is from Irish Gleann Ó Ruachta, "valley of the O'Roughty [tribe]". This name is first recorded in Mac Carthaigh's Book (1262). The Irish word ruacht means "red-haired," so the tribal name means "Descendants of the Red-Haired One." The name later transferred to the Roughty River.

The Ó Gríobhtha (Griffin) were centred at Ballygriffin during the era of Gaelic Ireland. The MacCarthys were centred in Glanarought in the mid-13th century. In the 18th and 19th centuries, the land belonged to the Marquesses of Lansdowne, who carried out much agricultural improvement.

== Geography ==
Glanarought is in the far southeast, running up to the Caha Mountains and the border with County Cork. It contains the Roughty River and the northeast part of the Beara Peninsula.

== List of settlements ==
Settlements within the historical barony of Glanarought include:

- Kenmare
- Kilgarvan
- Tuosist
