= Glengarriff Forest =

Nature Reserve in County Cork, Ireland

Coordinates: 51°45′26″N 9°33′32″W

- Irish: Tearmann Dúlra Gleann Garbh
- IUCN category IV (habitat/species management area)
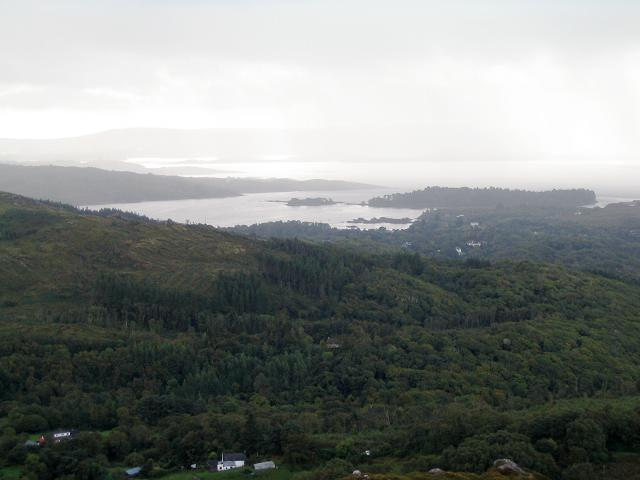
- Interactive map of Glengarriff Forest
- Location: County Cork, Ireland
- Area: 300 ha (740 acres)
- Established: 1991
- Governing body: National Parks and Wildlife Service

Glengarriff Forest is an area of woodland near Glengarriff, West Cork, Ireland. Most of the woodland is a nature reserve in public ownership which is sometimes referred to as Glengarriff "forest park" or "state forest".

Glengarriff Forest is one of the best examples in the country of oceanic sessile oak woodland. It is part of the much larger Glengarriff Harbour & Woodlands Special Area of Conservation (SAC).

== History ==
In the eighteenth century the woods were acquired by the White family for whom the title Earl of Bantry was created. The Earls of Bantry were responsible for planting some of the trees which are alive in the twenty-first century. In 1955, ownership of 380ha of the woods passed to the state which used them for commercial forestry purposes. Extensive planting of conifers occurred, and many of the oldest oak trees were felled or ring-barked.

In the 1970s, the ecological value of the remaining areas of oak was recognised and in 1991 a Nature Reserve was designated. Glengarriff Woods Nature Reserve covers some 300ha and is managed by the National Parks and Wildlife Service for conservation and amenity. Some conifers have been replaced with oak trees.

== Flora and fauna ==
Sika deer have been recorded, but regeneration of the forest suffers less from grazing than the similar woods at Killarney where there is a larger deer population.

The mild climate favours Hiberno-Lusitanian species, such as the Kerry slug, which are to be found in south-west Ireland and the Iberian peninsula. The Kerry slug thrives in the forest's oak trees, and is a "selection feature" of the Special Area of Conservation. Another example of a Lusitanian species to be found in the forest is the Strawberry Tree (Arbutus unedo).
