= Harold Peto =

Architect and garden designer (1854–1933)

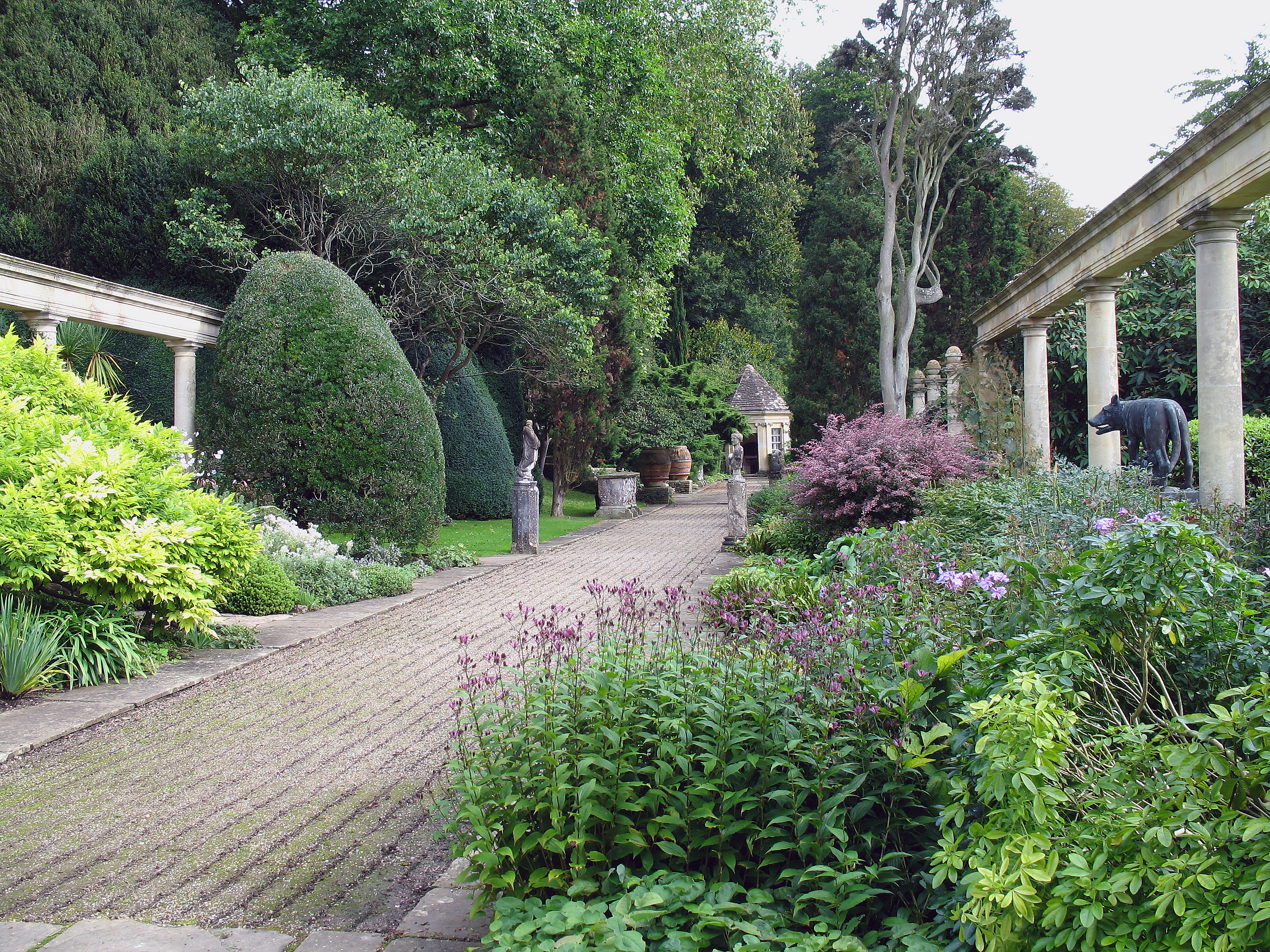
The Peto Gardens at Iford Manor

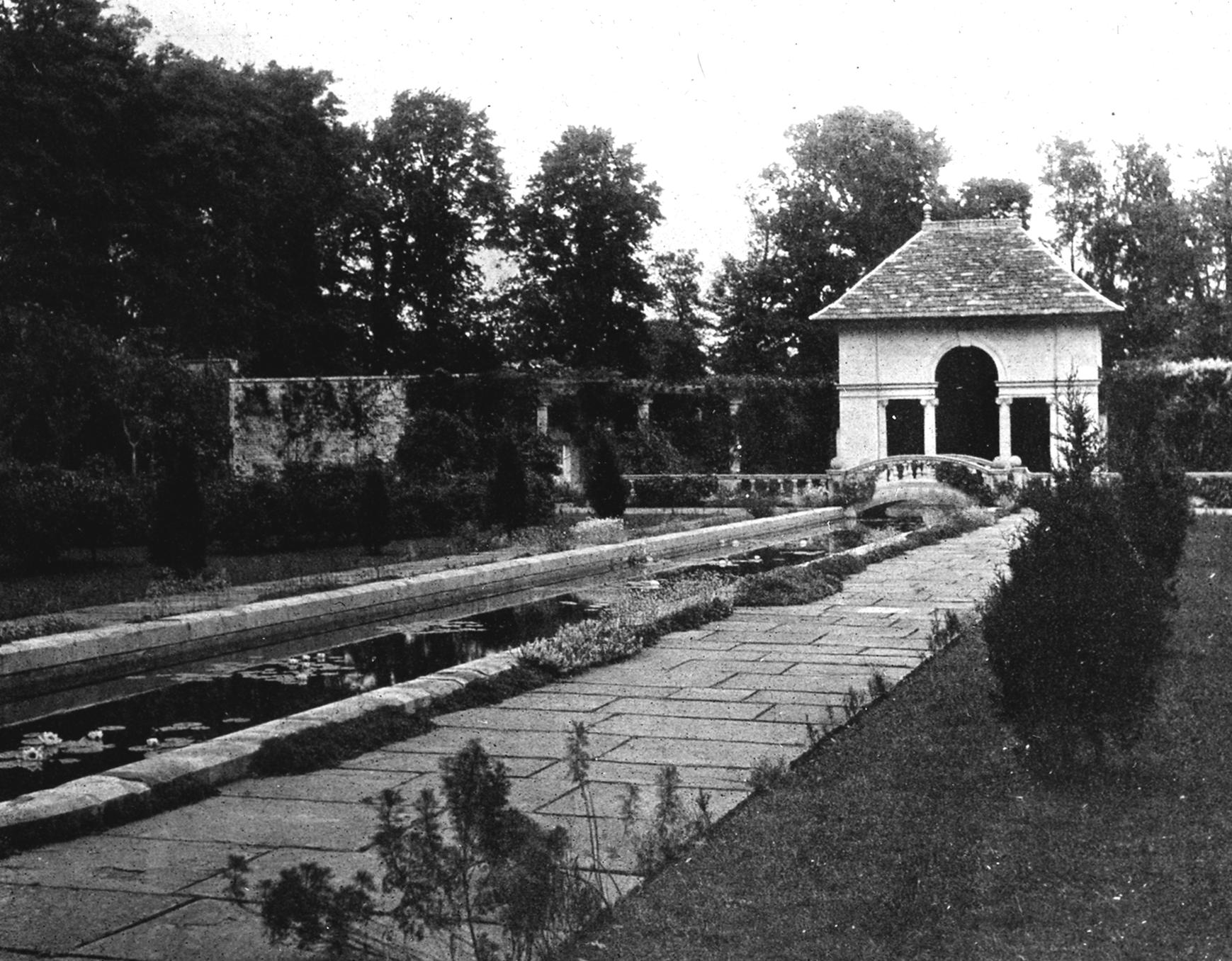
Hartham Park, the new water garden, 1903

Harold Ainsworth Peto FRIBA (11 July 1854 – 16 April 1933) was a British architect, landscape architect and garden designer, who worked in Britain and in Provence, France. Among his best-known gardens are Iford Manor, Wiltshire; Buscot Park, Oxfordshire; West Dean House, Sussex; and Ilnacullin, County Cork, Ireland.

== Biography ==
Harold Ainsworth Peto was born in London on 11 July 1854. He was the son of a prosperous builder, engineer and railway-contractor, Samuel Morton Peto, of Somerleyton Hall in Lowestoft, Suffolk, and of Sarah Ainsworth (née Kelsall), his father's second wife. Harold had four step-brothers and -sisters and ten brothers and sisters. Somerleyton Hall, where Harold spent his boyhood, had been rebuilt in the 1840s in Neo-Renaissance style and had a large winter garden and a parterre designed by William Andrews Nesfield.

In 1855 Harold's father was made a baronet; but in the 1860s his businesses ran into trouble, so that in 1863 he sold Somerleyton Hall and in 1866 became bankrupt. Briefly Harold was sent to board at Harrow School (1869–1871), but he left school at seventeen and did not pursue a higher education.

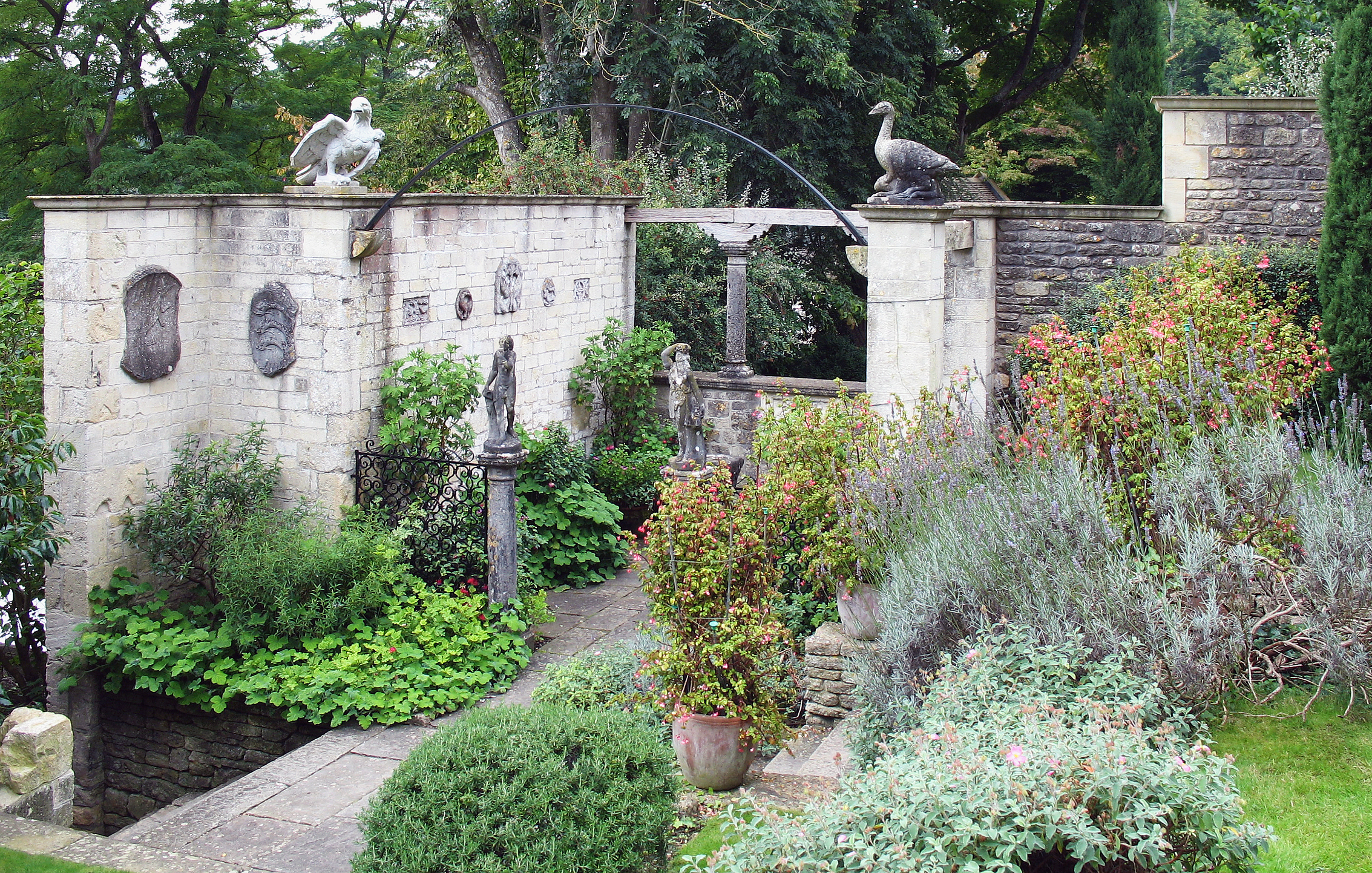
Iford Manor garden feature

On leaving school he was apprenticed to a joiner for nearly a year, then entered the practice of the architects J. Clements of Lowestoft. A year later he joined the London architects, Karslake and Mortimer.

In 1876 Peto went into partnership with architect Ernest George – a partnership which would last sixteen years. He and George designed houses in Kensington and Chelsea, as well as country houses. In 1883 Peto became a Fellow of the Royal Institute of British Architects (RIBA); but ill health compelled him to leave London. During these years he kept diaries recording his extensive travels to Italy, America, Spain and Greece.

In 1892 Peto ended his partnership with Ernest George, and based himself in Kent (1892–1895) and afterwards at Landford Lodge near Salisbury (1896–1899). Again these were years of travel: to Egypt, Italy, Germany and France; and in 1898 he made a round-the-world tour which included Japan.

In 1899 Peto purchased and moved to Iford Manor in west Wiltshire, having visited it that year with his friend, Henry Avray Tipping. He made Iford his permanent base, for which he re-designed and expanded the garden, trying out new ideas, and incorporating the artefacts collected during his travels around the world. The garden at Iford illustrates particularly his Arts and crafts approach to architecture and garden design.

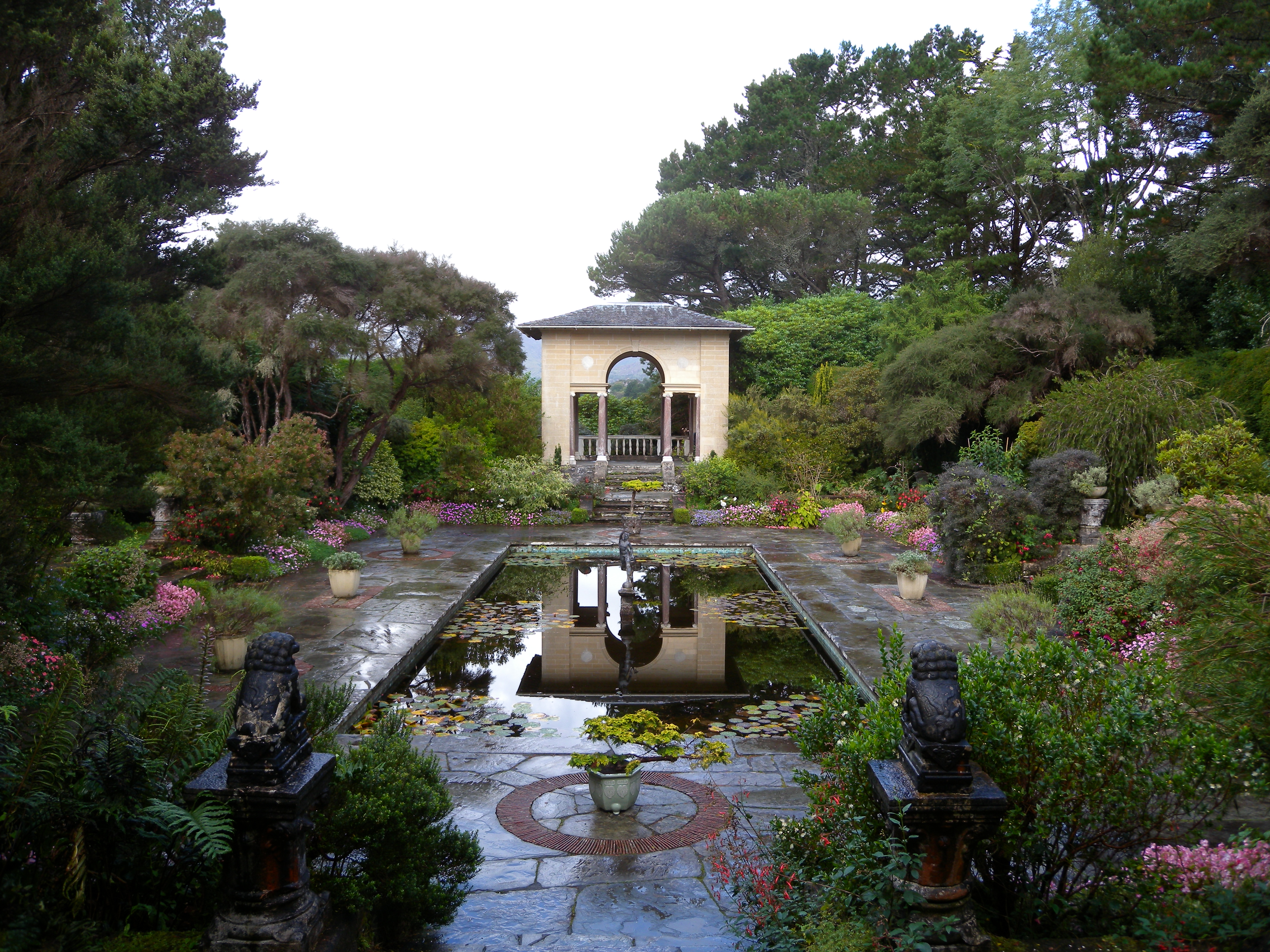
The Italian Garden on Ilnacullin

Most of Peto's major commissions were executed between 1900 and 1914. His projects include work at Easton Lodge, Essex; West Dean House, Sussex; Crichel House, Dorset; Petwood, Lincolnshire; High Wall, Oxford; Buscot Park, Oxfordshire; Hartham Park, Wiltshire; Bourton Hall, Warwickshire; Bridge House, Surrey; Heale House, Woodford, Wiltshire; Wayford Manor House, Somerset; Burton Pynsent House, Somerset and Ilnacullin, County Cork, Ireland. He also designed a series of gardens in Mediterranean France – at Cannes the Isola Bella, and at Cap Ferrat the villas Sylvia, Maryland and Rosemary.

A good example of Peto's garden architecture can be seen at West Dean House, Sussex, now housing West Dean College, where his 300-foot (91 m) pergola is a highlight of the gardens. Peto and Ernest George also directed an extension of the house for William James (father of poet Edward James, patron of the Surrealist art movement); they created the Oak Room, the old dining room and the staircase, all of which can still be seen within West Dean College.

Peto was also interested in interior design, and in 1907 he was commissioned to design the first-class accommodation aboard the transatlantic liner Mauretania.

Peto died at Iford Manor on 16 April (Easter Day), 1933.
