= List of townlands of the barony of Bantry, County Cork =

This is a sortable table of the townlands in the barony of Bantry, County Cork, Ireland. Duplicate names occur where there is more than one townland with the same name in the barony, and also where a townland is known by two alternative names. Names marked in bold typeface are towns and villages, and the word Town appears for those entries in the area column.

== Townland list ==
Townland	Area (acres)	Barony	Civil parish	Poor law union
Abbey	27	Bantry	Kilmocomoge	Bantry
Ahil Beg	260	Bantry	Kilmocomoge	Bantry
Ahil More	498	Bantry	Kilmocomoge	Bantry
Ahildotia	144	Bantry	Kilmocomoge	Bantry
Ardaturrish Beg	401	Bantry	Kilmocomoge	Bantry
Ardaturrish More	458	Bantry	Kilmocomoge	Bantry
Ardnacloghy	322	Bantry	Kilmocomoge	Bantry
Ardnagashel	198	Bantry	Kilmocomoge	Bantry
Ardnageehy Beg	175	Bantry	Kilmocomoge	Bantry
Ardnageehy More	229	Bantry	Kilmocomoge	Bantry
Ardnamanagh	126	Bantry	Kilmocomoge	Bantry
Ardrah	477	Bantry	Kilmocomoge	Bantry
Ards Beg	188	Bantry	Kilmocomoge	Bantry
Ards More (East)	87	Bantry	Kilmocomoge	Bantry
Ards More (West)	77	Bantry	Kilmocomoge	Bantry
Ardyhoolihane	85	Bantry	Kilmocomoge	Bantry
Ballylicky	131	Bantry	Kilmocomoge	Bantry
Ballynamought	542	Bantry	Kilmocomoge	Bantry
**Bantry**	Town	Bantry	Kilmocomoge	Bantry
Barnagerargh	171	Bantry	Kilmocomoge	Bantry
Beach	317	Bantry	Kilmocomoge	Bantry
Boolteenagh	146	Bantry	Durrus	Bantry
Breeny Beg	161	Bantry	Kilmocomoge	Bantry
Breeny More	351	Bantry	Kilmocomoge	Bantry
Caher	74	Bantry	Kilmocomoge	Bantry
Caherdaniel East	119	Bantry	Kilmocomoge	Bantry
Caherdaniel West	96	Bantry	Kilmocomoge	Bantry
Cahermoanteen	257	Bantry	Kilmocomoge	Bantry
Cahermuckee	706	Bantry	Kilmocomoge	Bantry
Cahernacrin	484	Bantry	Kilmocomoge	Bantry
Cappaboy Beg	633	Bantry	Kilmocomoge	Bantry
Cappaboy More	782	Bantry	Kilmocomoge	Bantry
Cappanaboul	260	Bantry	Kilmocomoge	Bantry
Cappanabrick	254	Bantry	Kilmocomoge	Bantry
Cappanaloha East	68	Bantry	Kilmocomoge	Bantry
Cappanaloha West	68	Bantry	Kilmocomoge	Bantry
Cappanavar	44	Bantry	Kilmocomoge	Bantry
Carran	485	Bantry	Kilmocomoge	Bantry
Carriganass	307	Bantry	Kilmocomoge	Bantry
Carrigboy	87	Bantry	Kilmocomoge	Bantry
Carrignagat	27	Bantry	Kilmocomoge	Bantry
Chapel Island (Little)	5	Bantry	Kilmocomoge	Bantry
Chapel Island	9	Bantry	Kilmocomoge	Bantry
Clashduff	27	Bantry	Kilmocomoge	Bantry
Cloonygorman	273	Bantry	Kilmocomoge	Bantry
Close	86	Bantry	Kilmocomoge	Bantry
Cooleenlemane	721	Bantry	Kilmocomoge	Bantry
Coomacroobeg	461	Bantry	Kilmocomoge	Bantry
Coomanore North	428	Bantry	Kilmocomoge	Bantry
Coomanore South	377	Bantry	Kilmocomoge	Bantry
Coomclogh	406	Bantry	Kilmocomoge	Bantry
Coomleagh East	848	Bantry	Kilmocomoge	Bantry
Coomleagh West	534	Bantry	Kilmocomoge	Bantry
Coorloum East	160	Bantry	Kilmocomoge	Bantry
Coorloum North	514	Bantry	Kilmocomoge	Bantry
Coorloum West	131	Bantry	Kilmocomoge	Bantry
Coorycommane	618	Bantry	Kilmocomoge	Bantry
Cooryleary	394	Bantry	Kilmocomoge	Bantry
Coumaclavlig	1,148	Bantry	Kilmocomoge	Bantry
Cousane	1,826	Bantry	Kilmocomoge	Bantry
Crossge	45	Bantry	Kilmocomoge	Bantry
Crowkingle	99	Bantry	Kilmocomoge	Bantry
Cullenagh	356	Bantry	Kilmocomoge	Bantry
Curraghavaddra	194	Bantry	Durrus	Bantry
Curraglass	1,417	Bantry	Kilmocomoge	Bantry
Currakeal	872	Bantry	Kilmocomoge	Bantry
Curramore	1,523	Bantry	Kilmocomoge	Bantry
Derreenathirigy	58	Bantry	Kilmocomoge	Bantry
Derreenclooig	1,396	Bantry	Kilmocomoge	Bantry
Derreenkealig	381	Bantry	Kilmocomoge	Bantry
Derroograne	593	Bantry	Kilmocomoge	Bantry
Derryarkane	216	Bantry	Kilmocomoge	Bantry
Derryclogher	2,204	Bantry	Kilmocomoge	Bantry
Derrycreigh	435	Bantry	Kilmocomoge	Bantry
Derryduff Beg	438	Bantry	Kilmocomoge	Bantry
Derryduff More	1,610	Bantry	Kilmocomoge	Bantry
Derryfadda	366	Bantry	Kilmocomoge	Bantry
Derryginagh East	280	Bantry	Kilmocomoge	Bantry
Derryginagh Middle	153	Bantry	Kilmocomoge	Bantry
Derryginagh West	87	Bantry	Kilmocomoge	Bantry
Derrynafinchin	792	Bantry	Kilmocomoge	Bantry
Derrynakilla	340	Bantry	Kilmocomoge	Bantry
Dromacappul	90	Bantry	Kilmocomoge	Bantry
Dromaclarig	95	Bantry	Kilmocomoge	Bantry
Dromacoosane	71	Bantry	Kilmocomoge	Bantry
Dromanassa	82	Bantry	Kilmocomoge	Bantry
Drombrow	320	Bantry	Kilmocomoge	Bantry
Dromclogh	117	Bantry	Kilmocomoge	Bantry
Dromclogh East	268	Bantry	Kilmocomoge	Bantry
Dromclogh West	179	Bantry	Kilmocomoge	Bantry
Dromdaniel	105	Bantry	Kilmocomoge	Bantry
Dromdoneen	60	Bantry	Kilmocomoge	Bantry
Dromdoneen East	46	Bantry	Kilmocomoge	Bantry
Dromdoneen West	53	Bantry	Kilmocomoge	Bantry
Dromduff East	222	Bantry	Kilmocomoge	Bantry
Dromduff West	216	Bantry	Kilmocomoge	Bantry
Dromgarriff	965	Bantry	Kilmocomoge	Bantry
Dromkeal	164	Bantry	Kilmocomoge	Bantry
Dromleigh North	102	Bantry	Kilmocomoge	Bantry
Dromleigh South	399	Bantry	Kilmocomoge	Bantry
Dromloughlin	62	Bantry	Kilmocomoge	Bantry
Dromnafinshin	69	Bantry	Kilmocomoge	Bantry
Dromreague	91	Bantry	Durrus	Bantry
Dromsullivan North	151	Bantry	Kilmocomoge	Bantry
Dromsullivan South	149	Bantry	Kilmocomoge	Bantry
Dunbittern East	76	Bantry	Kilmocomoge	Bantry
Dunbittern West	73	Bantry	Kilmocomoge	Bantry
Dunnamark	99	Bantry	Kilmocomoge	Bantry
Dunnamark Mill-lot	9	Bantry	Kilmocomoge	Bantry
Farranfadda	557	Bantry	Kilmocomoge	Bantry
Garranboy Island	1	Bantry	Kilmocomoge	Bantry
Gearagh	68	Bantry	Kilmocomoge	Bantry
Glanareagh	743	Bantry	Kilmocomoge	Bantry
Glanbannon Upper	512	Bantry	Kilmocomoge	Bantry
Glanbannoo Lower	196	Bantry	Kilmocomoge	Bantry
Gortagarry	112	Bantry	Kilmocomoge	Bantry
Gortloughra	1,443	Bantry	Kilmocomoge	Bantry
Gortnacowly	466	Bantry	Kilmocomoge	Bantry
Gortroe	251	Bantry	Kilmocomoge	Bantry
Gouree Beg	75	Bantry	Kilmocomoge	Bantry
Gouree More	75	Bantry	Kilmocomoge	Bantry
Gurraghy	113	Bantry	Kilmocomoge	Bantry
Gurteen	126	Bantry	Durrus	Bantry
Gurteenroe	260	Bantry	Kilmocomoge	Bantry
Hog Island	1	Bantry	Kilmocomoge	Bantry
Hollyhill	105	Bantry	Kilmocomoge	Bantry
Horse Island	1	Bantry	Kilmocomoge	Bantry
Illane	334	Bantry	Kilmocomoge	Bantry
Illauncreeveen	3	Bantry	Kilmocomoge	Bantry
Inchiclogh	111	Bantry	Kilmocomoge	Bantry
Inchinagoum	359	Bantry	Kilmocomoge	Bantry
Inchinarihen	360	Bantry	Kilmocomoge	Bantry
Inchiroe	975	Bantry	Kilmocomoge	Bantry
Iskanafeelna	237	Bantry	Kilmocomoge	Bantry
Kealanine	628	Bantry	Kilmocomoge	Bantry
Kealcoum	49	Bantry	Kilmocomoge	Bantry
Kealkill	772	Bantry	Kilmocomoge	Bantry
Kilmore	233	Bantry	Kilmocomoge	Bantry
Kilnaknappoge	238	Bantry	Kilmocomoge	Bantry
Kilnaruane	20	Bantry	Kilmocomoge	Bantry
Kinathfineen	10	Bantry	Kilmocomoge	Bantry
Kippaghingergill	176	Bantry	Kilmocomoge	Bantry
Knockanecosduff	266	Bantry	Kilmocomoge	Bantry
Knocknamuck	103	Bantry	Kilmocomoge	Bantry
Lackareagh	268	Bantry	Kilmocomoge	Bantry
Lackavane	627	Bantry	Kilmocomoge	Bantry
Lahadane	68	Bantry	Kilmocomoge	Bantry
Laharan East	51	Bantry	Kilmocomoge	Bantry
Laharan West	91	Bantry	Kilmocomoge	Bantry
Laharanshermeen	175	Bantry	Kilmocomoge	Bantry
Lisheen	590	Bantry	Kilmocomoge	Bantry
Lissareemig	78	Bantry	Durrus	Bantry
Loughdeeveen	74	Bantry	Kilmocomoge	Bantry
Lousy Castle Island	1	Bantry	Kilmocomoge	Bantry
Maugha	411	Bantry	Kilmocomoge	Bantry
Maughanaclea	1,592	Bantry	Kilmocomoge	Bantry
Maughanasilly	313	Bantry	Kilmocomoge	Bantry
Maularaha	205	Bantry	Kilmocomoge	Bantry
Maulavanig	444	Bantry	Kilmocomoge	Bantry
Maulikeeve	194	Bantry	Kilmocomoge	Bantry
Mill Big	200	Bantry	Kilmocomoge	Bantry
Mill Little	120	Bantry	Kilmocomoge	Bantry
Milleencoola	18	Bantry	Kilmocomoge	Bantry
Mullagh	173	Bantry	Durrus	Bantry
Newtown	330	Bantry	Kilmocomoge	Bantry
Rabbit Island	2	Bantry	Kilmocomoge	Bantry
Raheen	301	Bantry	Kilmocomoge	Bantry
Raheen Beg	74	Bantry	Kilmocomoge	Bantry
Raheen More	218	Bantry	Kilmocomoge	Bantry
Reenadisert	130	Bantry	Kilmocomoge	Bantry
Reenaknock	120	Bantry	Kilmocomoge	Bantry
Reenavanny	149	Bantry	Kilmocomoge	Bantry
Reenrour East	21	Bantry	Kilmocomoge	Bantry
Reenrour West	77	Bantry	Kilmocomoge	Bantry
Reenydonagan	198	Bantry	Kilmocomoge	Bantry
Rooska East	293	Bantry	Durrus	Bantry
Rooska West	295	Bantry	Durrus	Bantry
Seafield	177	Bantry	Kilmocomoge	Bantry
Shanaknock	59	Bantry	Kilmocomoge	Bantry
Shandrum Beg	130	Bantry	Kilmocomoge	Bantry
Shandrum More	212	Bantry	Kilmocomoge	Bantry
Shanvallybeg	47	Bantry	Kilmocomoge	Bantry
Sheskin	318	Bantry	Kilmocomoge	Bantry
Shronagreehy	348	Bantry	Kilmocomoge	Bantry
Skahanagh	59	Bantry	Kilmocomoge	Bantry
Skahanagh Beg	39	Bantry	Kilmocomoge	Bantry
Skahanagh Lower	44	Bantry	Kilmocomoge	Bantry
Skahanagh More	167	Bantry	Kilmocomoge	Bantry
Slip	24	Bantry	Kilmocomoge	Bantry
Snave	247	Bantry	Kilmocomoge	Bantry
Tedagh	187	Bantry	Durrus	Bantry
Tooreen	292	Bantry	Kilmocomoge	Bantry
Tooreen South	131	Bantry	Kilmocomoge	Bantry
Town Lots	90	Bantry	Kilmocomoge	Bantry
Trawnahaha	199	Bantry	Kilmocomoge	Bantry
Trawnamaddree	562	Bantry	Kilmocomoge	Bantry
