= Slieve Miskish Mountains =

Small low mountain range, County Cork, Ireland

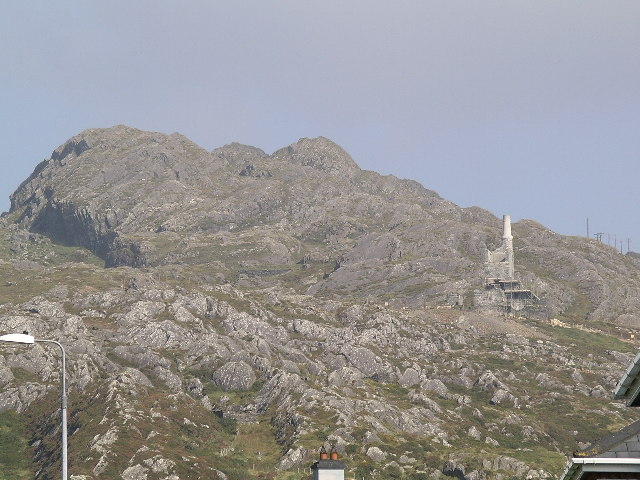

Highest point
- Peak: Knockoura
- Elevation: 490 m (1,610 ft)
- Coordinates: 51°40′N 9°57′W

Geography
- Country: Ireland
- Provinces of Ireland: Munster

The Slieve Miskish Mountains are a small range of low sandstone mountains found at the extreme south-western tip of the Beara Peninsula of County Cork in Ireland. The name derives from the Irish "Sliabh Mioscais," "the Mountains of Malice." Unlike the Caha Mountains, which lie further north on the peninsula, the Slieve Miskish Mountains lie entirely on the Cork side of the peninsula, part of which belongs to County Kerry. There are only four named mountain peaks in the range: Knocknagallaun, 376 m; Knockgour, 481 m; Knockoura, 490 m; and Miskish Mountain, 386 m. They overshadow the main town on the peninsula, Castletownbere, as well as the village of Allihies on their western slope, which was once the centre of a thriving copper mining industry in the 19th century. The now-abandoned mines and surrounding buildings can still be seen on the mountain slopes above Allihies. The Cappaghavuckee boulder-burial monument is situated on a narrow rocky ledge on the lower slopes of the Slieve Miskish Mountains about 5.5km to the east of Castletownbere.

== See also ==
- List of mountains in Ireland
