= Beara Peninsula =

Peninsula straddling counties Cork and Kerry, Ireland

Coordinates: 51°43′48″N 9°50′24″W

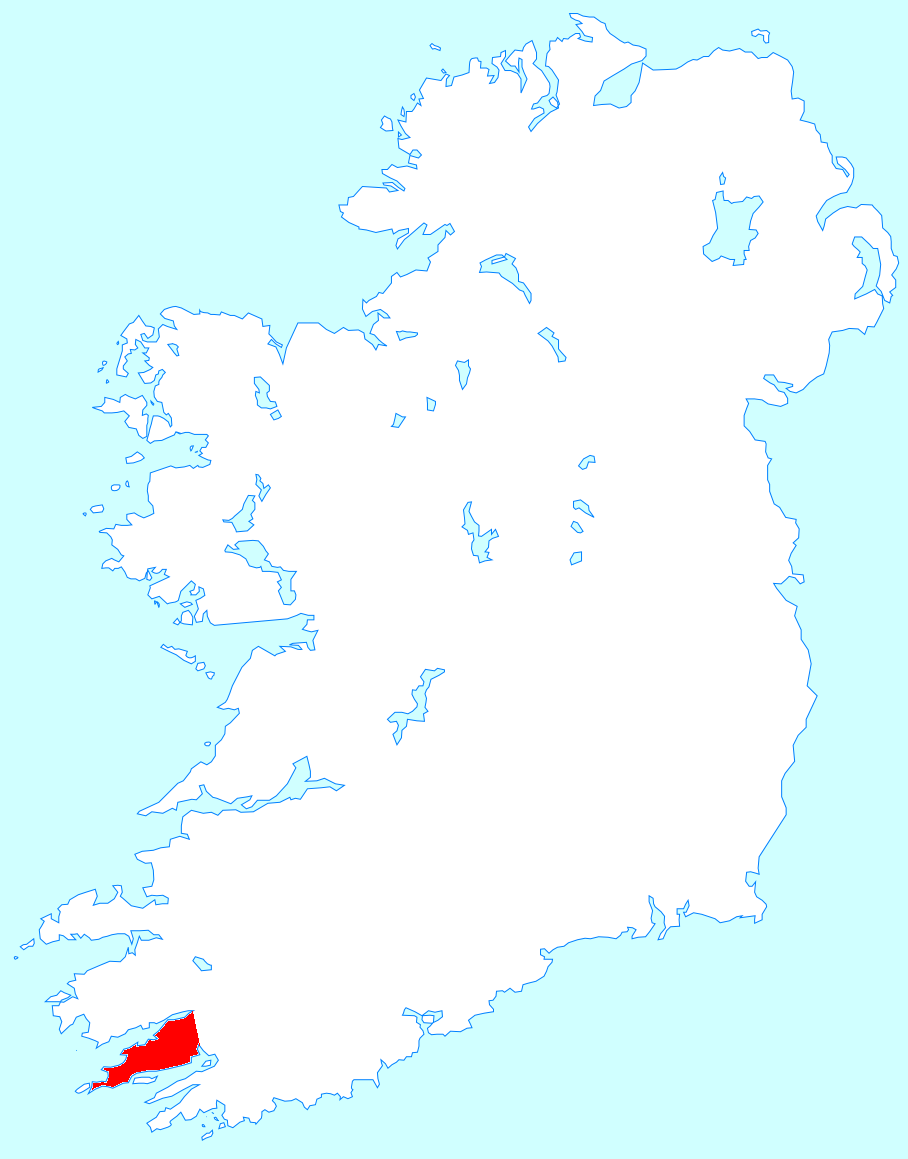
Location of the Beara Peninsula

Beara (Irish: Béarra) or the Beara Peninsula is a peninsula on the south-west coast of Ireland, bounded between the Kenmare River (which is actually a bay) to the north side and Bantry Bay to the south. It contains two mountain ranges running down its centre: the Caha Mountains and the Slieve Miskish Mountains. The northern part of the peninsula from Kenmare to near Ardgroom is in County Kerry, while the rest forms the barony of Bear in County Cork.

The main features of Beara's landscape were formed during the quaternary period which ended 12,000 years ago. There is evidence of human activity on the peninsula dating from at least 3000 BC. Later it was invaded by Vikings, and in the 17th century became a defensive position for the English Army against French invasion. Its population peaked at 39,000 before the Great Famine; today there are fewer than 6000 living in the area.

The peninsula contains a long and varied scenic coast, two mountain ranges and a number of passes, and forms part of the Wild Atlantic Way.

== History ==
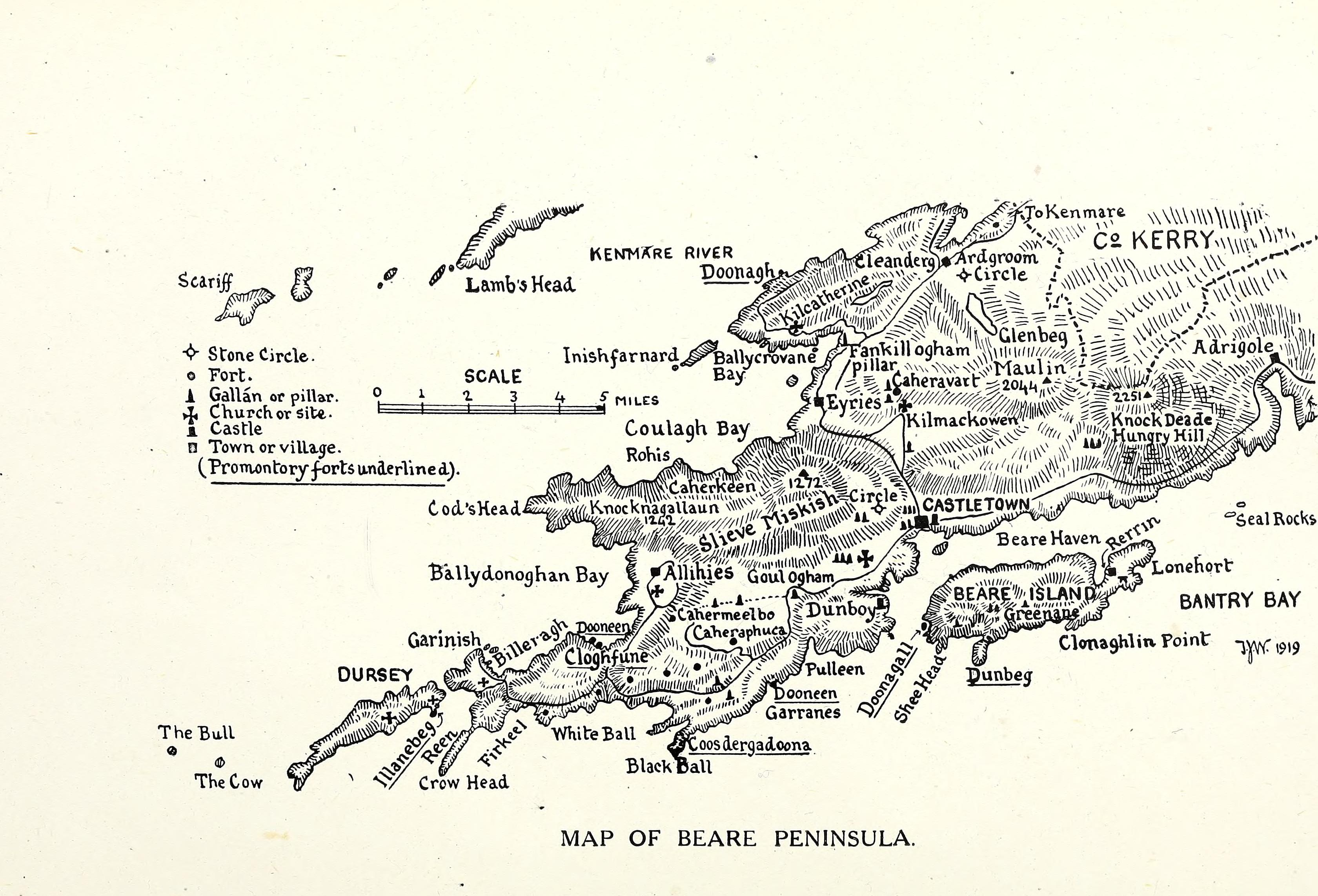
Map of ancient sites on the Beara Peninsula

The peninsula was glaciated during the quaternary period; evidence from this era survives in the form of striae around Hungry hill, and erratics on the western road into Glengarriff. The first signs of human activity date to c 3000 BC, and consist of traces of Early Bronze Age settlements. The landscape is rich in megalithic monuments and other prehistoric archeological sites, including over 70 standing stones, 22 stone rows, 38 dolmens, as well as wedge tombs, stone circles. Later the area became a Viking settlement, as evident in place names such as Longhart. Levels of Early Medieval activity can be deduced from the presence of many ringforts, cashels, cairns and fulacht fiadh.

In the modern period, Beara was the traditional seat of power of the O'Sullivan Beare and one of the last points of native Irish clan resistance after the 1601 Battle of Kinsale. Allihies, on the tip of Beara, later became major copper mines and featured in the Daphne du Maurier novel 'Hungry Hill' – later made into a film. Around 1796, the French navy threatened Bantry Bay, and the British Army responded by erecting defences on Bere Island, including martello and watch towers.

A plaque placed by the Beara Historical Society offers the following to explain the origin of the name:

In the early centuries AD, Conn Céad Cathach (Con of the hundred battles) fought a fierce battle against Owen Mór, King of Ireland at Cloch Barraige. Owen was badly injured in the battle. Those of his followers who survived took him to Inis Greaghraighe (now known as Bere Island) as a safe place for him to recover. There, the fairy Eadaoin took him to her grianán (bower) where she nursed him back to full health. Nowadays, this place is known as Greenane.
Owen and his followers then sailed southwards until they reached Spain. There he met and married Beara, daughter of the King of Castille.
Later Owen, Beara and a large army sailed from Spain and landed in Greenane. Owen took his wife to the highest hill on the island and looking across the harbour he named the island and the whole peninsula 'Beara' in honour of his wife. Rossmacowen, Kilmacowen and Buaile Owen most likely are named after Owen Mór and his son. According to local tradition Owen’s wife, Princess Beara, died and was buried in Ballard Commons in the remote and peaceful valley between Maulin and Knocknagree Mountains.

The scholar Nollaig Ó Muraíle doubted this story, and instead suggested a connection to the Kerry dialect word béarach, béar[r]a which refers to "rocks on the seashore against which the sea breaks with great force".

== Tourism ==
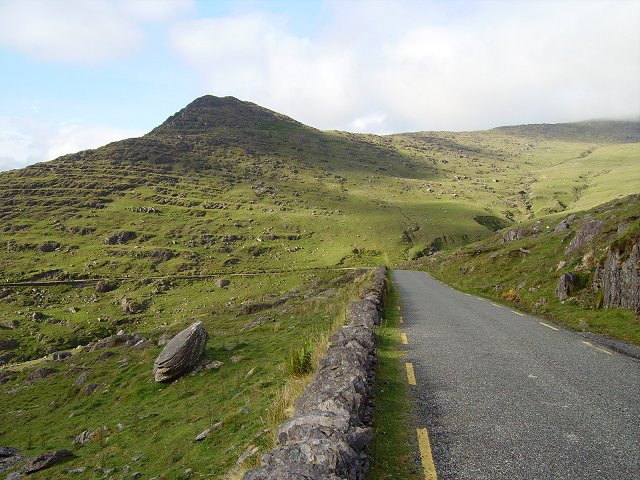
Stookeennaloakareha

Tourist sites on the peninsula include the ruins of Dunboy Castle and Puxley Mansion, the Copper Mines Museum in Allihies, Garnish Island by Glengarriff (maintained by the OPW) and Derreen Garden (privately owned but open to the public).

The "Ring of Beara" follows the roads for about 148 kilometres (92 mi) circumnavigating the peninsula. It starts in Kenmare, crossing the Healy Pass through Adrigole, passing Castletownbere, Allihies, and turn offs to Dursey Island, Eyeries and Ardgroom, ending in Glengarriff. The area has had a long connection with the sea; Castletownbere is one of Ireland's largest fishing ports and the largest white fishing port, where several companies offer services such as diving, training and a marina.

The Beara Way is a long distance walking route around the peninsula with several historical and archaeological sites en route. The main towns on the route are Castletownbere, Kenmare and Glengarriff. There are a number of villages in between including Allihies, Ardgroom, Adrigole, and Eyeries. Bere Island and Dursey Island can be reached by a short trip by ferry or cable car respectively. The Beara Way is part of the Beara-Breifne Way based on the march of O'Sullivan Beare in 1603. The tallest Ogham stone in Europe, the Ballycrovane Ogham Stone, is close to Eyeries.

== Flora and fauna ==
Glengarriff Forest Nature Reserve covers approximately 300 hectares (371 acres), the majority being "old oak woodland and regenerating woodland", with non-native conifers and rhododendron having been cleared from the forest in favour of native species. A booklet, published by the Glengarriff Tourism and Development Association, describes the forest as "one of the best examples of oceanic sessile oak woodland in Ireland". Other native flora, including recurved sandwort and Kerry lily, are found around the Caha Mountains.

Glengarriff's harbour contains one of the largest colonies of harbor seals in Ireland. At the other end of the peninsula, the Beara Peninsula Special Protection Area, one of several Special Protection Areas in Ireland, is home to an "internationally important population" of Chough birds. It also supports a breeding population of Fulmar.

It was revealed in 2021 that a genetically unique honey bee (Apis mellifera) had been discovered on the Beara Peninsula, belonging to the Apis mellifera mellifera subspecies. Unlike other A. m. mellifera in Ireland, which are descended primarily from the Netherlands imported around 1923, because the Isle of Wight Disease at the time, had wiped out the previous Old Irish Black Bee, the Beara A. m. mellifera showed a unique genetic identity largely unrelated to other A. m. mellifera. This causes speculation that it could be a remnant of the Old Irish Black Bee. Further research showed that it was somehow able to breed true and not cross breed with other different subspecies in the area.

== Gallery ==
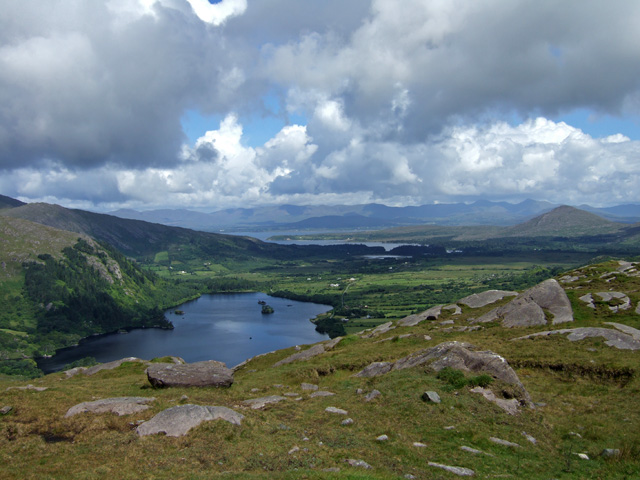
Glanmore Lake

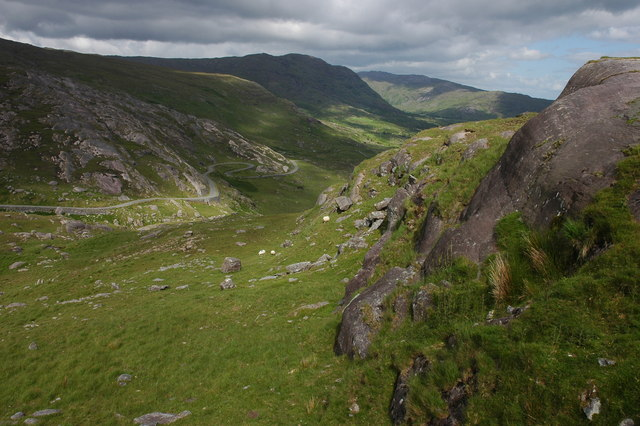
Healy Pass - distance

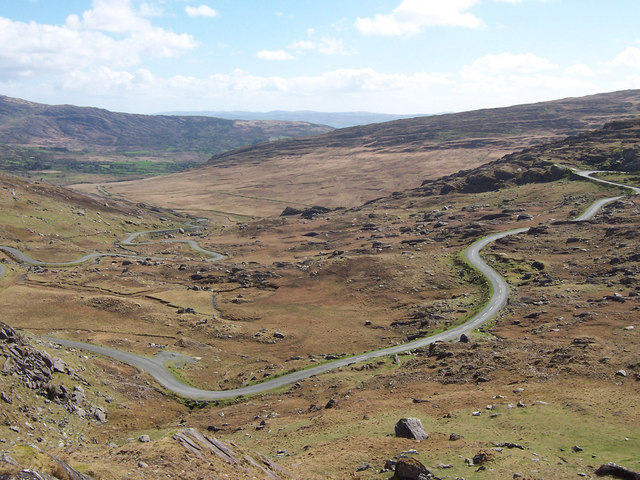
Healy Pass - road

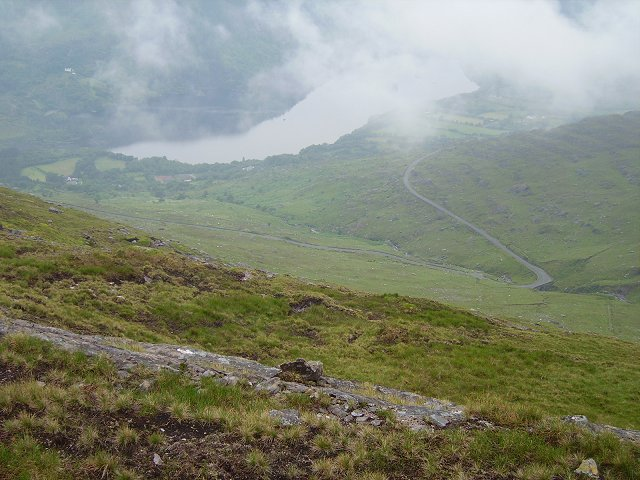
Coolcreen

== See also ==
- The Hag of Beara
- Iveragh peninsula
- Dingle peninsula

== Sources ==
- Murphy, Cornelius (1997). The Prehistoric Archaeology of the Beara Peninsula, Co. Cork. University College Cork.
