= Garnish Island =

Island in County Cork, Ireland

Garinish
Native name: Garinis
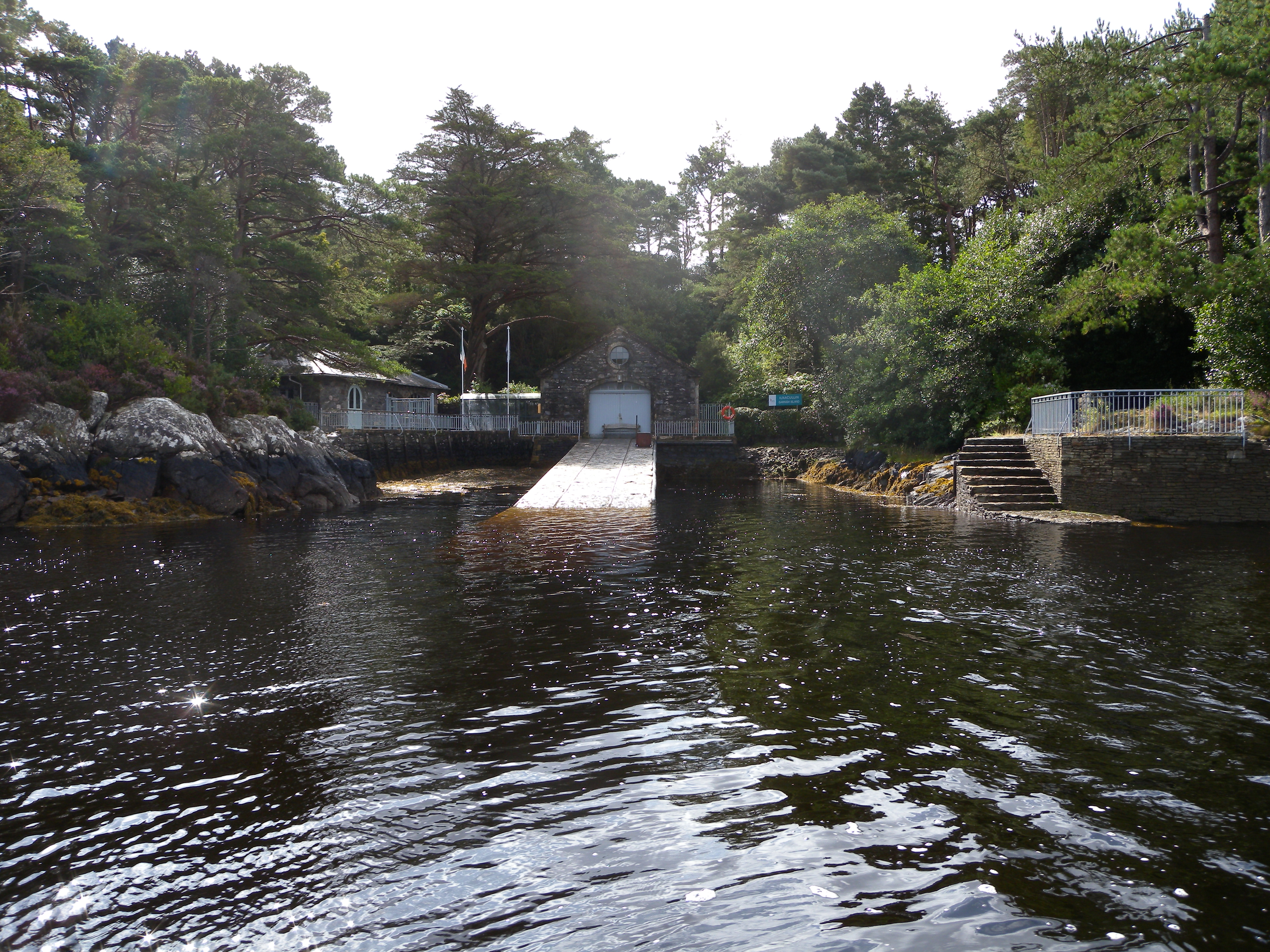
- Landing slip

- Location within island of Ireland

Geography
- Location: Bantry Bay
- Coordinates: 51°44′11″N 9°32′28″W

Administration
- Ireland
- Province: Munster
- County: Cork

Garinish, or Garnish Island, (Irish: Garinis; also known as Ilnacullin) is an island in Glengarriff Bay, an inlet of Bantry Bay, near the shore of the Beara Peninsula in County Cork, Ireland. It is a tourist attraction with walled gardens and a Martello tower.

== History ==
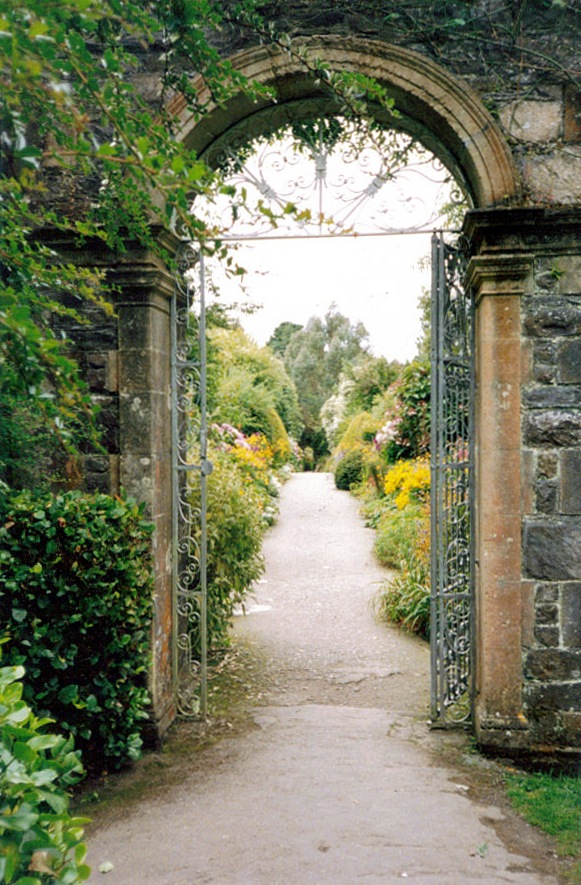
Entrance to the walled garden

The garden was designed by Harold Peto, (1854–1933), for its owner John Annan Bryce, (1841–1923), a Belfast native, who purchased the island from the War Office in 1910. Bryce's son Roland bequeathed the island to the Irish nation in 1953. It was taken over and is still maintained by the Office of Public Works. Renowned for its gardens and architecture (a mansion was designed by Peto but was never built), the island has played host to writers including George Bernard Shaw and George William Russell.

There is a restored Martello tower on the island dating from the time of the Napoleonic Wars. The tower, like others in Cork, but unlike other Irish Martello towers, has a straight cylindrical shape that does not splay out at its base.

Historical population

Year	Pop.	±%
1841	13	—
1851	4	−69.2%
1861	4	+0.0%
1871	0	−100.0%
1881	11	—
1891	8	−27.3%
1901	5	−37.5%
1911	5	+0.0%

Year	Pop.	±%
1926	87	+1640.0%
1936	105	+20.7%
1946	4	−96.2%
1951	3	−25.0%
1956	2	−33.3%
1961	2	+0.0%
1966	2	+0.0%
1971	2	+0.0%

Year	Pop.	±%
1979	2	+0.0%
1981	2	+0.0%
1986	2	+0.0%
1991	1	−50.0%
1996	1	+0.0%
2002	0	−100.0%
2006	0	0.00%

Source: Central Statistics Office. "CNA17: Population by Off Shore Island, Sex and Year". CSO.ie.

Mains electricity was brought to the island in the early 1950s via overhead cable.

== Gardens ==
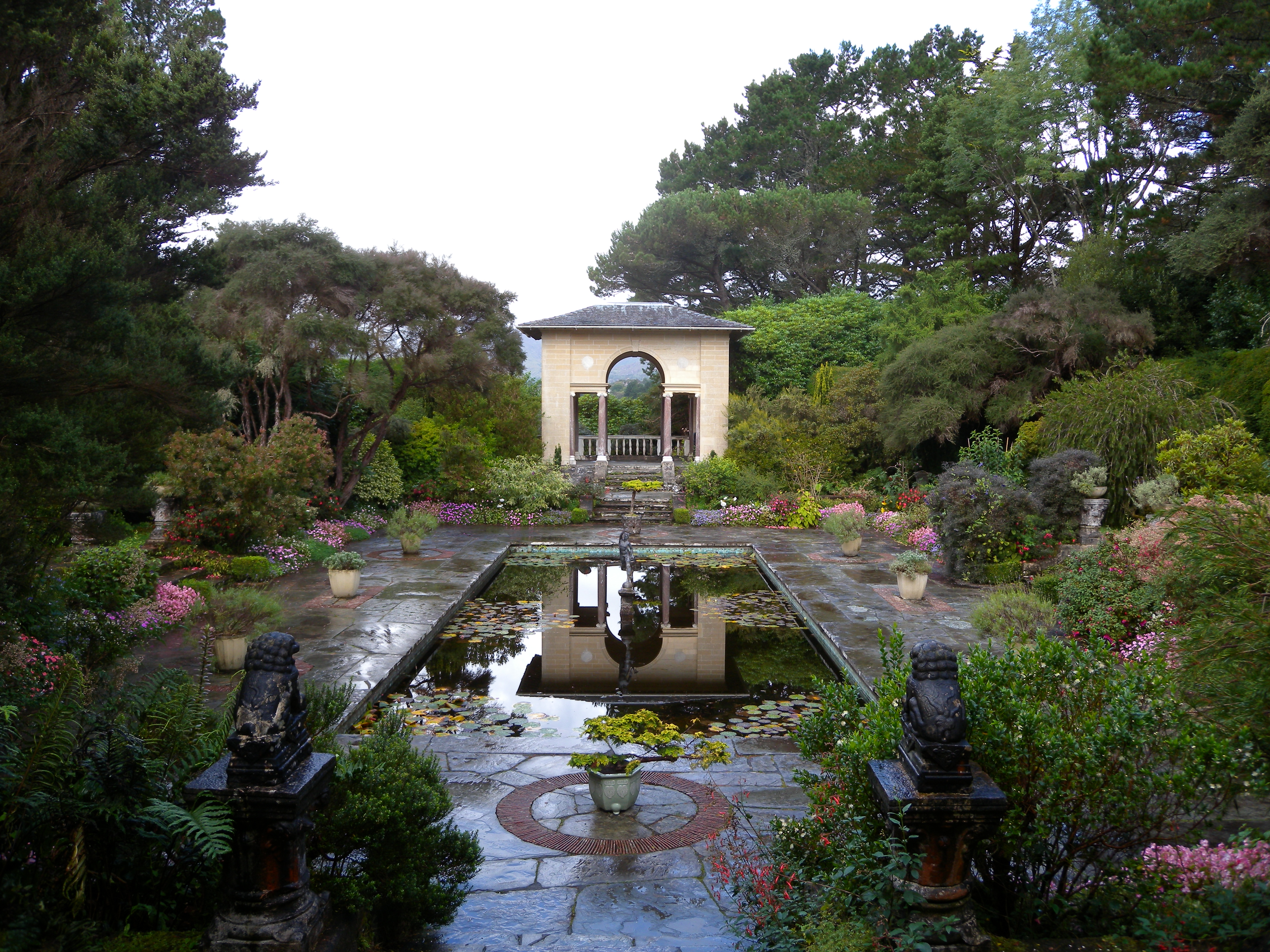
Italian Garden on Garnish Island

The island extends to 15 hectares (37 acres) and is renowned for its gardens which flourish in the mild humid micro-climate of Glengarriff harbour assisted by a mainly pine shelter belt. Structures include a clock tower, a Grecian temple, a Martello Tower, and an Italian casita.

== Access ==
Several ferries service the island from the village of Glengarriff. These ferries generally include a tour of the nearby seal colony.

== See also ==
- Historic Cork Gardens
