= Glengarriff =

Tourist village in County Cork, Ireland

Glengarriff An Gleann Garbh
- Village
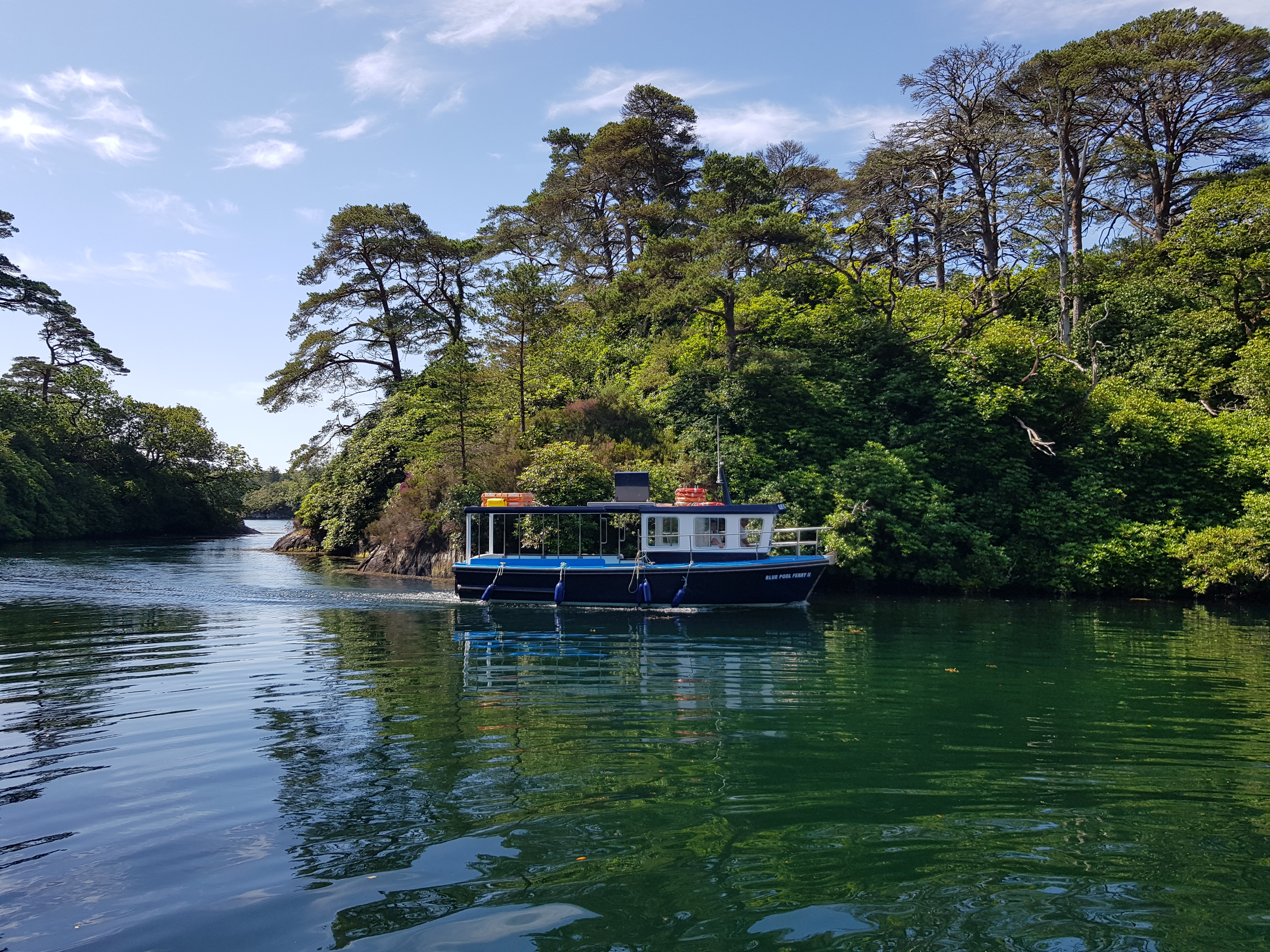
- The Blue Pool, Glengarriff

- Location in Ireland
- Coordinates: 51°45′00″N 9°33′07″W
- Country: Ireland
- Province: Munster
- County: County Cork

Population (2022)
  - Total: 211
- Time zone: UTC+0 (WET)
  - Summer (DST): UTC-1 (IST (WEST))
- Irish Grid Reference: V925564
- Website: www.glengarriff.ie

Glengarriff (Irish: An Gleann Garbh, meaning 'the rough glen') is a village of approximately 200 people on the N71 national secondary road in the Beara Peninsula of County Cork, Ireland. Known internationally as a tourism venue, it has a number of natural attractions. It sits at the northern head of Glengarriff Bay, a smaller enclave of Bantry Bay.

At 18 kilometres (11 mi) northwards along the N71 road from Bantry, and 33 kilometres (21 mi) eastwards along the R572 road Castletownbere, it is a common stopping-point along the routes around the area.

== Economy ==
Primarily, the economy revolves around a combination of tourism, farming and local services.

== Attractions ==
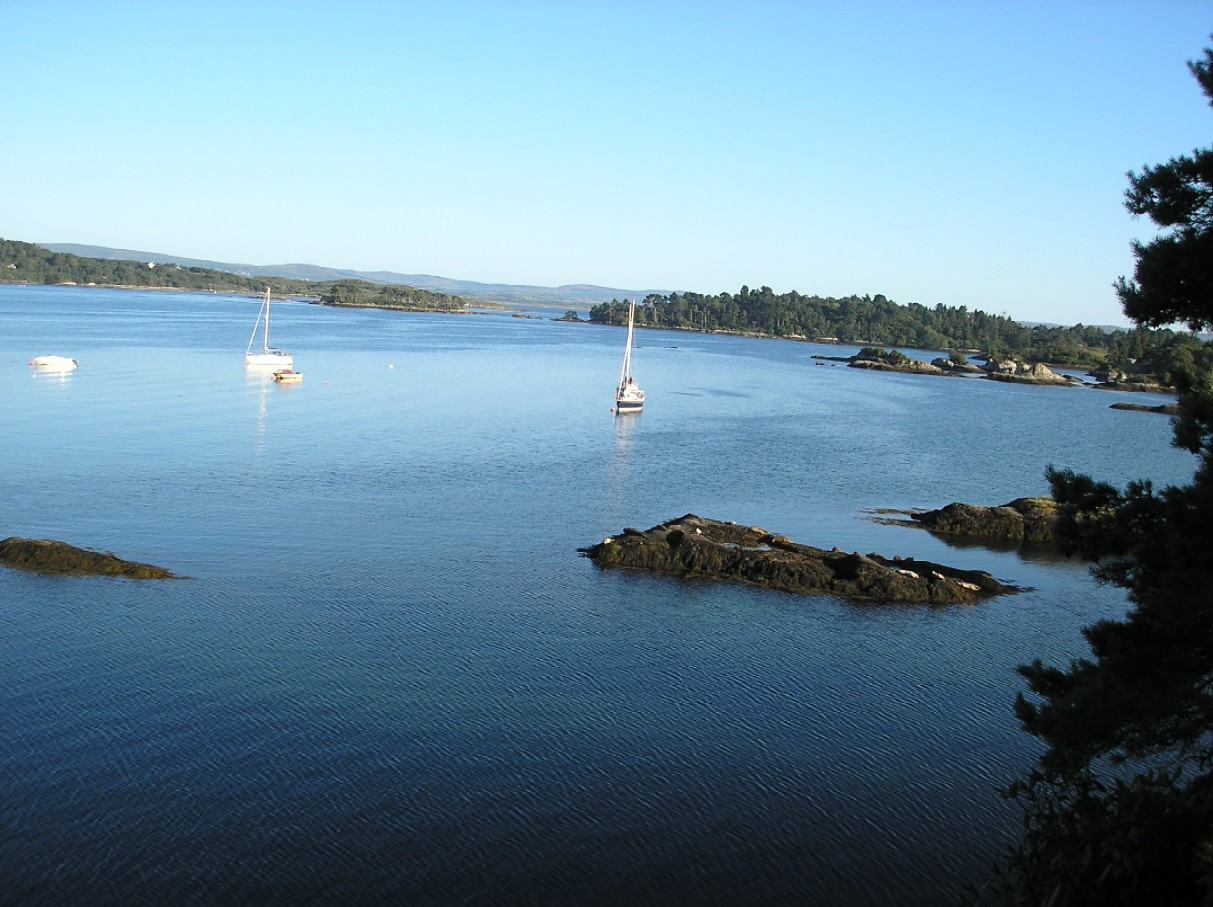
Glengarriff harbour

Glengarriff is a small seaside village on the Ring of Beara surrounded by high rugged mountains pocked with old bogs being farmed for peat. Local tourist sites include the Italian Gardens on Garnish Island (Ilnacullin), which may be visited by boat trip. Offering a broad view of the surrounding area, the round Martello tower on the island was built to guard against a threatened Napoleonic invasion that never materialized.

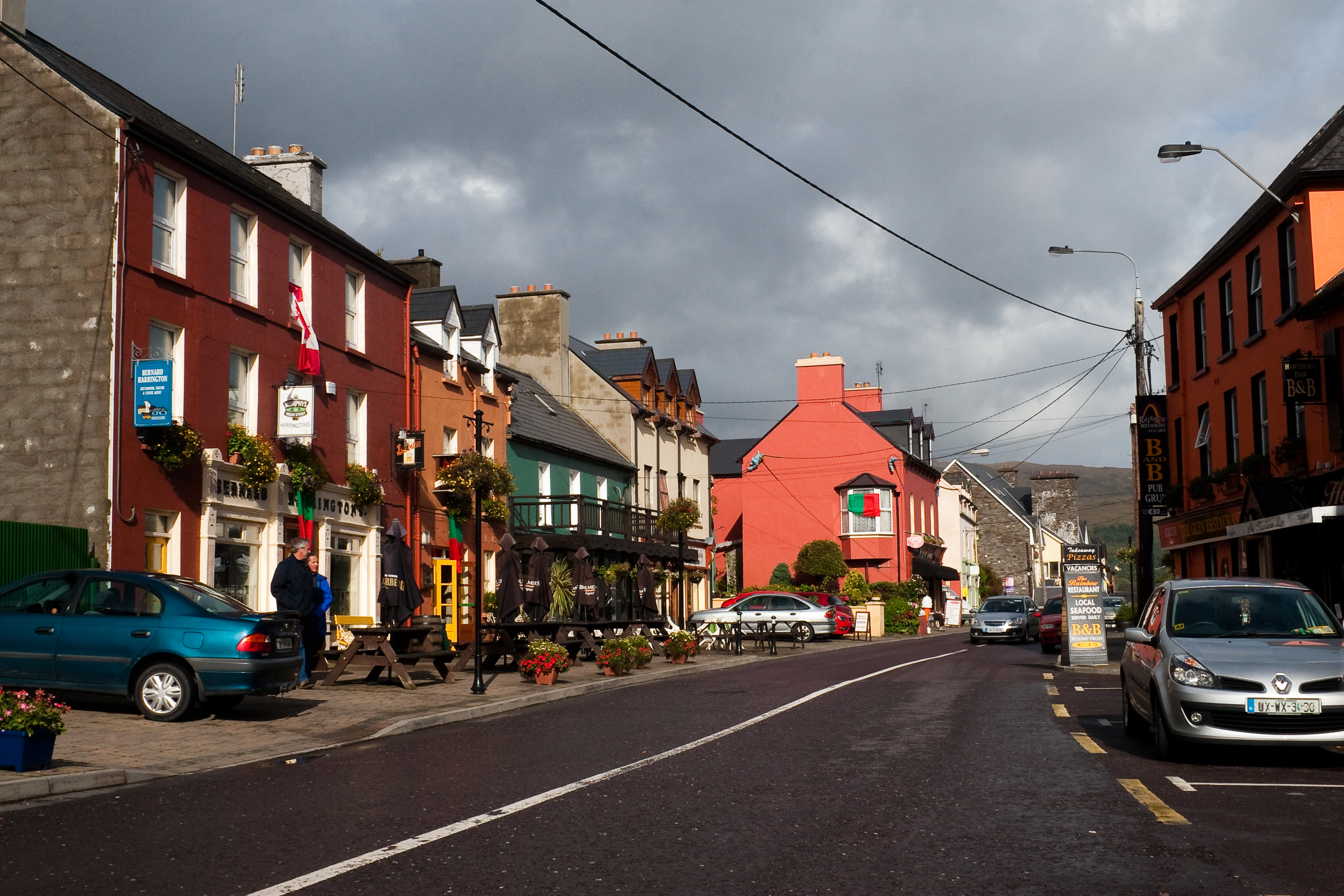
Restaurants and shops at the N71

In the nearby Glengarriff Forest is the glen that gave Glengarriff its name, (loosely translated as rough glen) containing some of the oldest and most extensive oak and birch groves left in Ireland. A short but steep trail leads up to Lady Bantry's Lookout, which has views over Glengarriff and the west Cork area. Other tourist amenities include the Bamboo Park, behind Toad Hall, a local amenity area featuring a child's playground and Blue Pool lagoon, the nearby Barley Lake and the historic Eccles Hotel. Walking trails in the area are extensive, kayaking on the bay is regularly scheduled, and live music is played at local pubs, particularly during the tourist season. Glengarriff also has several shops, pubs, restaurants and other services.

Glengarriff harbour is a sheltered anchorage and has visitors moorings for visiting yachts.

Glengarriff has an annual music festival, the Jim Dowling Uilleann Pipe & Trad Festival, which takes in June and focuses on uilleann piping.

== Sport ==
Glengarriff Golf Club is a nine-hole course on the east side of the village. It is associated with the late Maureen O'Hara, the film actress, who had a home nearby.

Glengarriff GAA Club was founded in 1981 after breaking away from neighbouring Adrigole GFC. It fields Gaelic football teams from Junior ‘A’ level to Under 6s. Teams compete in leagues and championships run by the Beara GAA division.

== Notable inhabitants ==
- John Annan Bryce (1841–1923), British businessman and politician who purchased Garnish Island in 1910.
- Maureen O'Hara (1920–2015), Irish-American actress, had a home in the area

== Cultural references ==
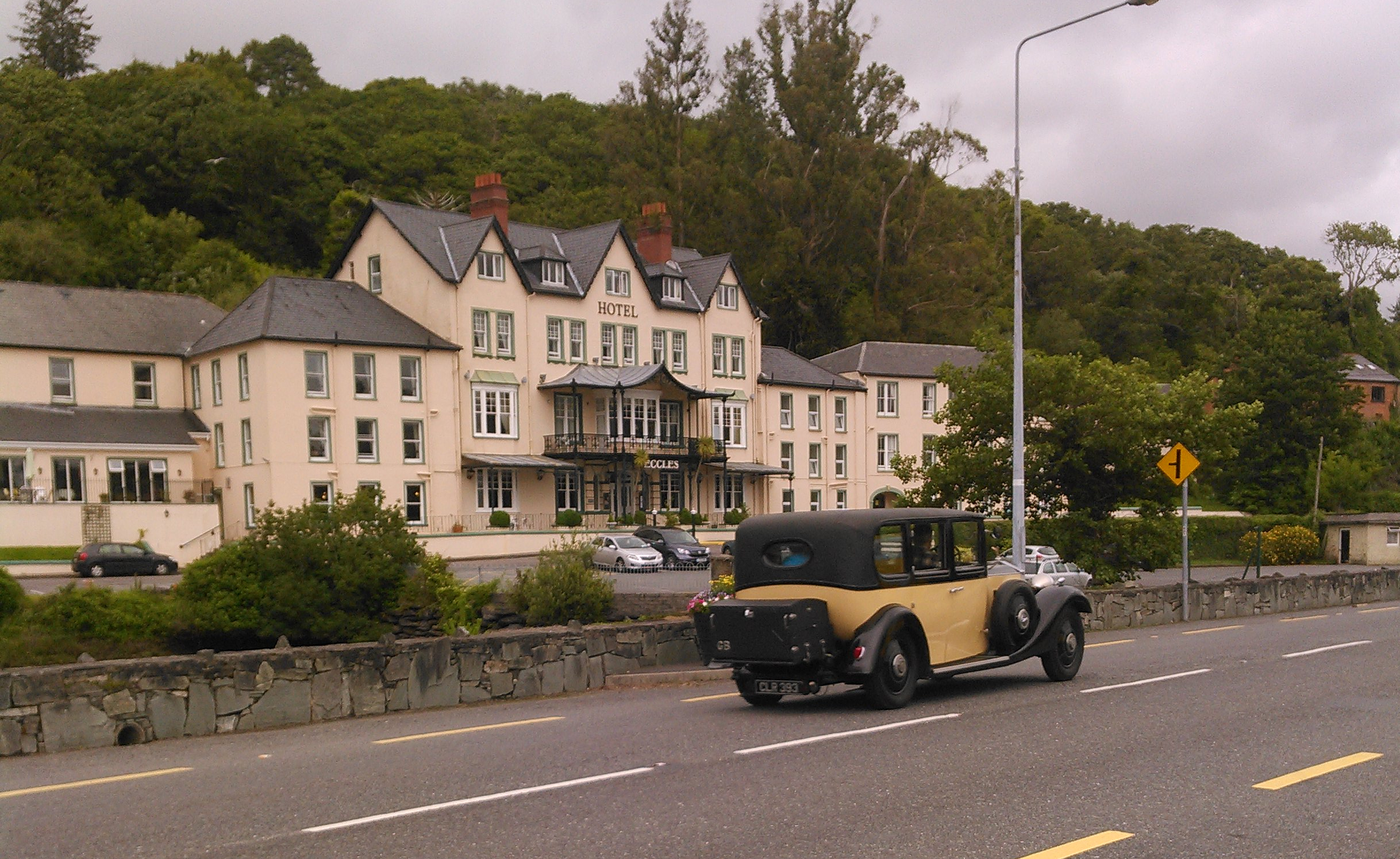
Eccles Hotel

Letitia Elizabeth Landon's poetical illustration, Glengariffe in Fisher's Drawing Room Scrap Book, 1833, accompanies an engraving of a view painted by William Henry Bartlett over Garnish Island looking towards the mountains in the West.

== See also ==
- Ellen Hutchins
- Historic Cork Gardens
- List of towns and villages in Ireland
