= Bantry Bay =

Bay located in County Cork, Ireland

- Bá Bheanntraí
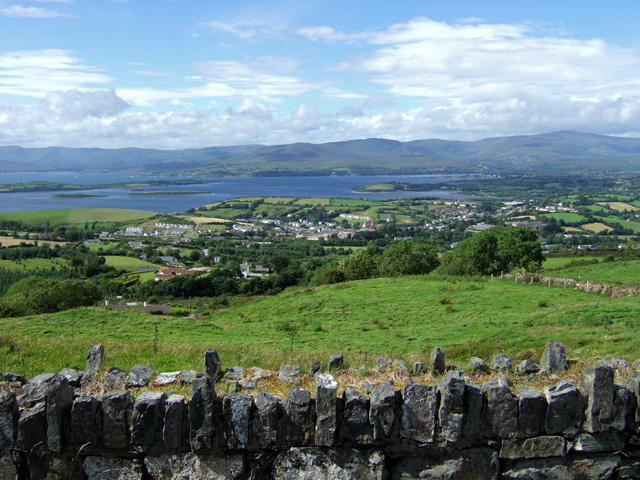
- Bantry town and bay from Sheskin

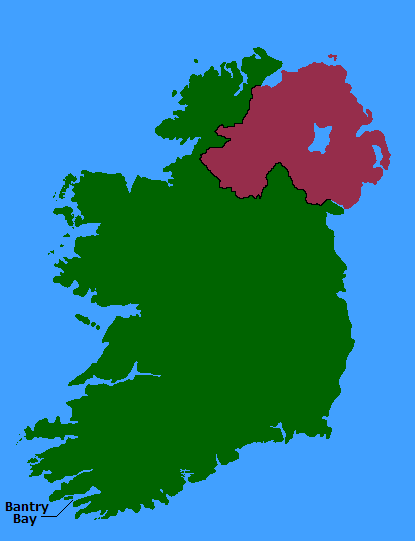
- Location: County Cork
- Coordinates: 51°39′N 9°43′W
- Ocean/sea sources: Atlantic Ocean
- Basin countries: Ireland
- Max. length: 35 km (22 mi)
- Max. width: 10 km (6 mi)
- Islands: Bere Island, Garnish Island, Whiddy Island
- Settlements: Adrigole, Bantry, Ballylickey, Castletownbere, Glengarriff

Bantry Bay (Irish: Bá Bheanntraí) is a bay located in County Cork, Ireland. The bay runs approximately 35 km (22 mi) from northeast to southwest into the Atlantic Ocean. It is approximately three to four kilometres (2–2 1/2 miles) wide at the head and 10 km (6 mi) wide at the entrance.

== Geographic features ==
Bantry Bay is a ria, a bay formed from a drowned river valley as a result of a relative rise in sea level. The bay is a deep (approx 40 metres in the middle) and large natural bay, with one of the longest inlets in southwest Ireland, bordered on the north by Beara Peninsula, which separates Bantry Bay from Kenmare Bay. The southern boundary is Sheep's Head Peninsula, separating Bantry Bay from Dunmanus Bay. The main islands in the bay are Bere Island and Whiddy Island. Bere Island is located near the entrance to the bay. On the north side of the island is Berehaven Harbour and Castletown Bearhaven port. The town of Rerrin is the largest settlement on the island. The village of Ballynakilla is also located there.

Whiddy Island is at the head of the bay near the south shore. It is the main petroleum terminus for Ireland, the harbour ideally suited for large oceangoing tankers. A Single Point Mooring (SPM) at the Whiddy Island oil terminal is operated by Zenith Energy, Ltd. Bantry Bay was featured during a famous Gulf Oil commercial showing the supertanker "Universe Kuwait" that aired during the time of the Apollo Moon landing in 1969.

Towns and villages around the bay include: Adrigole, Bantry, Ballylickey, Cahermore, Cappanolsha, Castletownbere (Castletown Bearhaven), Donemark, Foilakill, Gerahies, and Glengarriff. Main routes that follow parts of the bay include the R572 (part of the "Ring of Beara") and the N71. The Bantry Bay Golf Club is at the head of the bay, across from Whiddy Island. The O'Sullivan Beara Dunboy Castle is just across from Bere Island in Berehaven Harbour. "Copper John" Puxley's Manor is in Dunboy. Daphne du Maurier's novel Hungry Hill is based on the Puxley family's involvement in the area's tin and copper mining industry.

== History ==
=== Battle of Bantry Bay ===
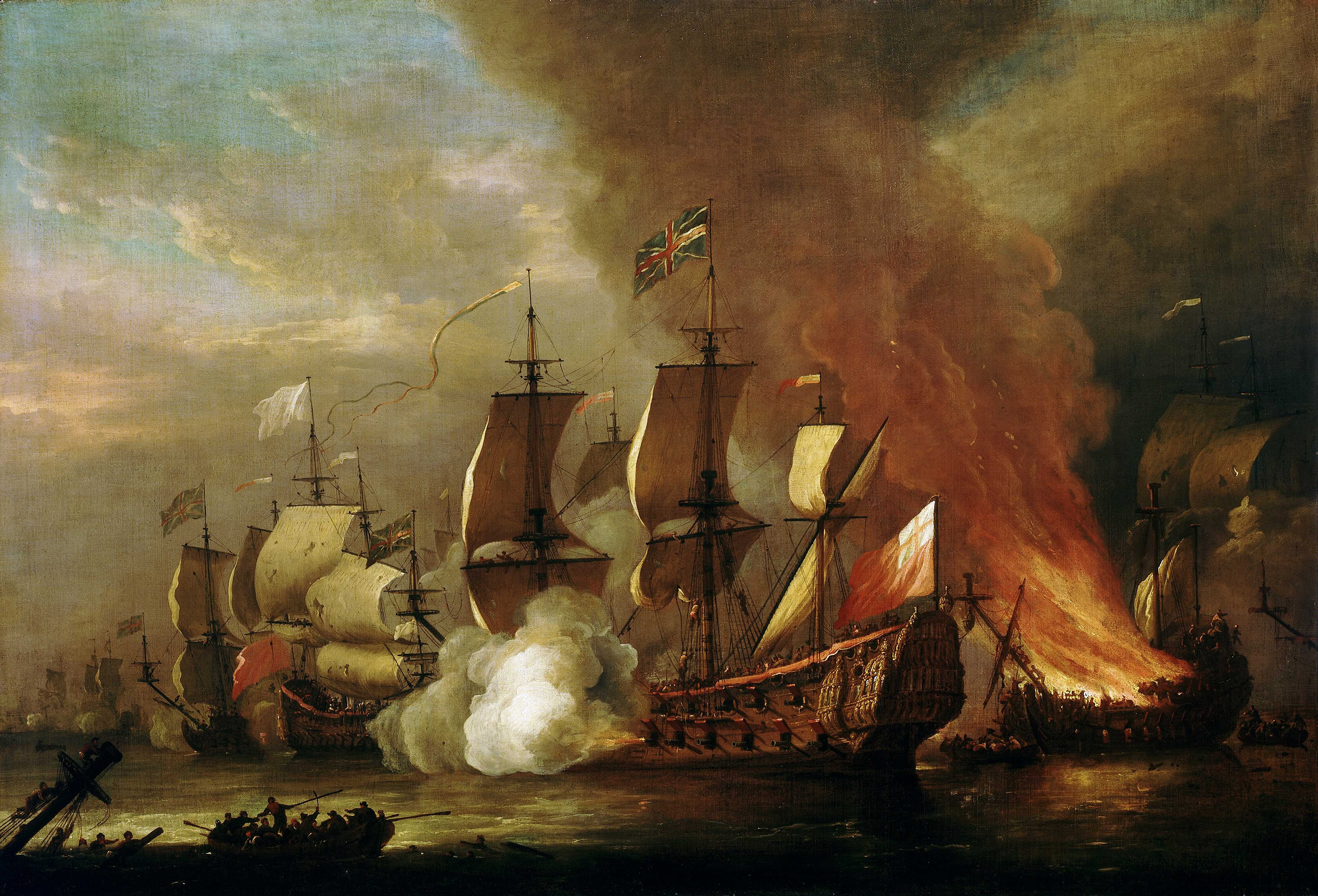
17th-century depiction of the battle.

The Battle of Bantry Bay occurred in 1689, during the Nine Years' War, between English and French fleets.

=== Rebellion of 1798 ===
The town of Bantry, at the head of the bay, is associated with the Irish Rebellion of 1798 through an earlier attempt, led by Irish revolutionary Wolfe Tone, to launch a rebellion there in December 1796. A French fleet, consisting of 43 ships carrying 15,000 troops, had divided mid-Atlantic into smaller groups to avoid interception by the Royal Navy and planned to reform at Bantry Bay. The bulk of the fleet arrived successfully but several ships, including the flagship Fraternité carrying General Hoche, were delayed. While awaiting their arrival, bad weather intervened and the lack of leadership, together with uneasiness at the prospect of being trapped, forced the decision to return to France. Tone wrote of the expedition in his diary, saying that "We were close enough to toss a biscuit ashore in Ahabeg in Berehaven Harbour." The square in Bantry is today named after Wolfe Tone.

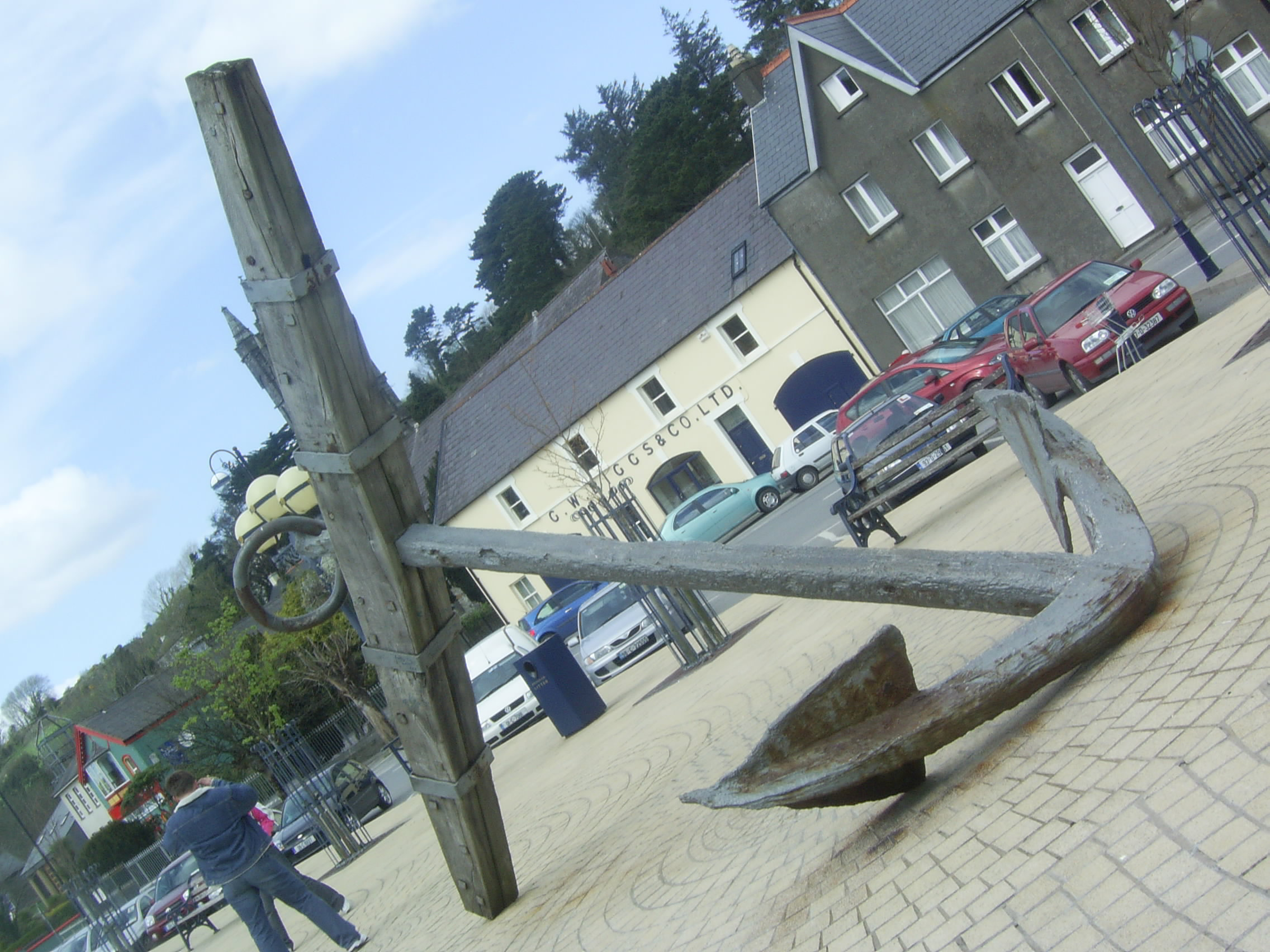
Anchor from the French Armada of 1796, discovered off northeast of Whiddy island, Bantry Bay, 1981

=== Bantry Longboat/Bere Island Longboat ===
A longboat used in a French scouting expedition landed in Bere Island and lay in Berehaven harbour for 102 years. It was taken to Bantry House in 1898, moved from Bantry House to Dublin in 1944 and was presented to the National Museum of Ireland. In 1977, it was lent to the Maritime Institute of Ireland who exhibited it at the National Maritime Museum of Ireland, Dún Laoghaire, until 2003. A scale model is now displayed. The longboat was restored at the Liverpool Museum at a cost of €50,000 and is on display in the National Museum of Ireland, Collins Barracks, as part of the Soldiers and Chiefs exhibition

=== Whiddy Island disaster ===
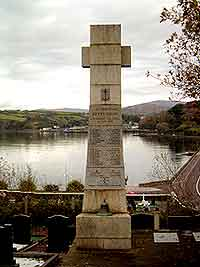
Betelgeuse memorial, St Finbarr's Church graveyard, Bantry – overlooking Bantry Harbour

On 8 January 1979, 50 people were killed when a French oil tanker, the Betelgeuse, was offloading at Whiddy Island when it caught fire, exploded, and broke into three pieces. The bay has had numerous shipwrecks over the years. In 1981, while cleanup efforts using sonar sweeps for the Betelgeuse were under way, the wreck of the French frigate La Surveillante, which had been scuttled during a storm north of Whiddy Island on 2 January 1797, was found.

== Rescue services ==
Bantry Inshore Search and Rescue Association (BISRA) provides an emergency lifeboat service to the Bantry Harbour community. Equipped with a high speed rescue RIB BISRA is a declared resource of the Irish Coastguard.

== Geographical stats ==
- United Nations Conference on Trade and Development (UNCTAD) code: IEBYT
