= History of Sligo =

History of Sligo, Ireland

The town of Sligo was founded in 1243 AD by the Norman knight Maurice Fitzgerald and Fedlim O'Conchobar the Rí Coiced (Provincial King) of Connacht. Norman influence appears to have lasted for about 60 years. From around 1310, after the Gaelic resurgence, the town existed well within the Gaelic cultural zone and developed on the Sligeach (Garavogue) river under the O’Conchobhar Sligigh dynasty and within the Irish túath of Cairbre Droma Cliabh as part of the Gaelic confederation of Iochtar Connacht (Lower Connacht) until the creation of County Sligo by the English Lord Deputy Henry Sidney in 1561.

== Origins ==
=== Name ===
The name Sligo is a corruption of the Irish name Sligeach, meaning "abounding in shells". It refers to the abundance of shellfish found in the estuary, and from the extensive shell middens along the shores of Sligo Bay. The name initially referred only to the river, then was applied to the town and eventually, also the county created in 1561.

=== Prehistory ===
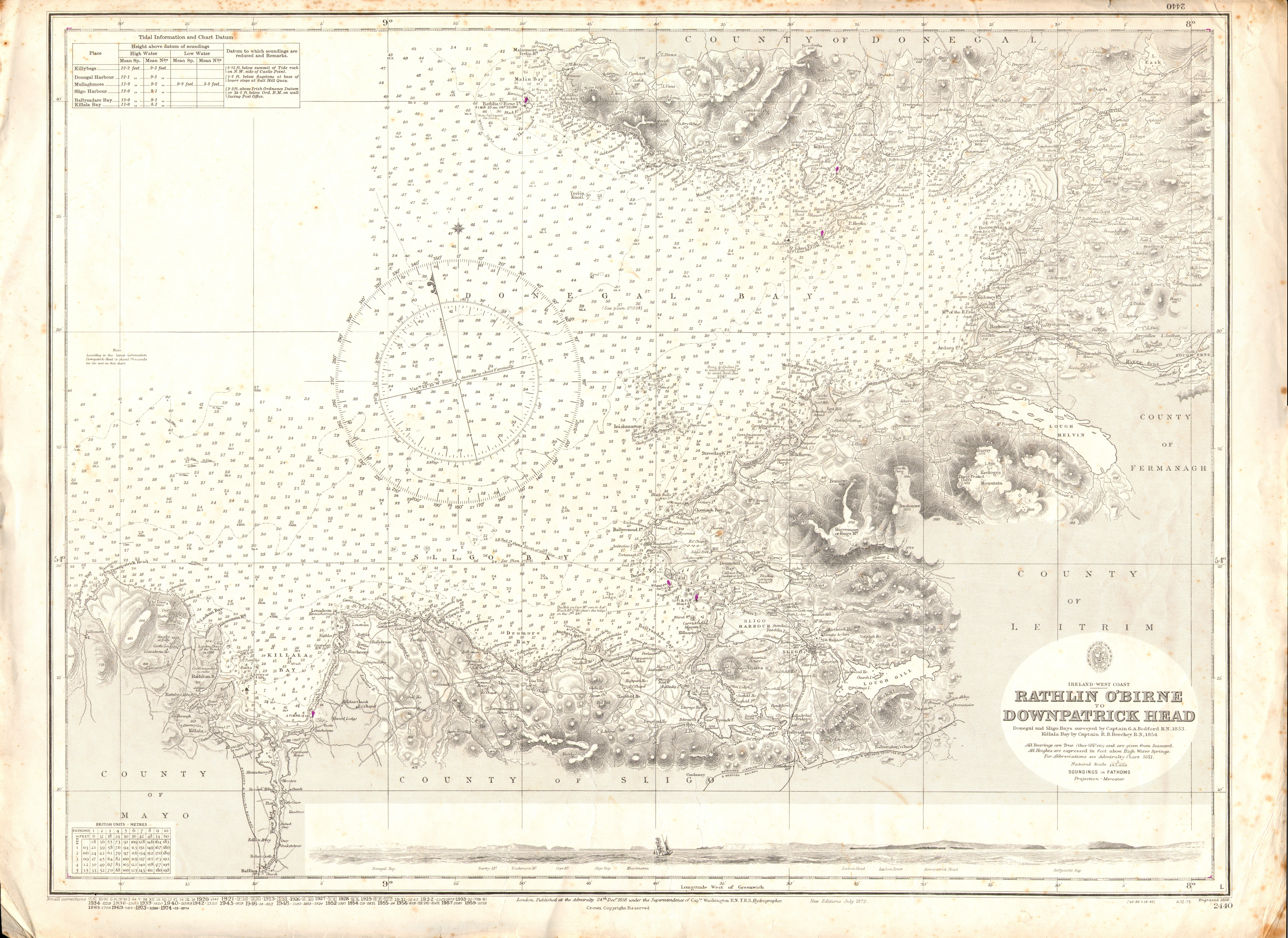
Chart of Sligo Harbour (1858)

Ancient settlement has centred on the bay of Sligo since the first human presence in the area roughly 8000 BC, as shown by extensive shell middens dating back to the Mesolithic era. The location was also strategic, being placed in the narrow gap between Lough Gill and the sea, and also on the narrow coastal corridor that forms the main western route between the provinces of Ulster and Connacht. It is a crossing point of several routes and is a natural meeting-place. Sligo is on several fords across the Garavogue river. The town follows a ridge of higher ground paralleling the river on the south side, and the High street appears to follow the course of a stream leading to the river.

The area saw intense activity in the late 5th and early 4th millennium BC. The town is surrounded by Neolithic archaeological remains, some of which are within the urban area. An outlier of the extensive early Neolithic cemetery at Carrowmore is on the south bank of the Garavogue river above a fording point. The oldest currently known causewayed enclosure in Britain and Ireland is situated on the high ground at the southwest edge of the town, at Magheraboy.

The area was densely enough settled to be known to Greek and Roman trading vessels, being marked on Ptolemy's co-ordinate map of the 2nd century AD, where it is entered as the town of Nagnata. This is the only settlement marked on the west coast of Ireland by Ptolemy. It is possible traders were attracted by the silver and lead mines on the coast at Ballysadare. The exact site of Nagnata remains unknown.

=== Early Christian ===
The present site of the town may have been a wooded area during the 5th century. "That there were woods along the Sligo river," which is mentioned in Tírecháns Life of Patrick, wherein the saint prophesied that in later times the sea would force people to move from the early church site of Killaspugbrone near Strandhill to the present location of the town further upriver.

The local Irish tuath, or territory, was called Cairbre Drom Cliabh or Críoch Cairbre. Another, older name, according to Acallamh na Sénorach was Críoch an Cosnámha (The District of Contention). Its age is unknown, but it appears to have acquired the name Cairbre in the 5th or 6th century AD.

Gaelic Ireland was not an urban society, but a form of proto-urbanisation was introduced at this time with the development of large monastic centres. Many religious establishments were created in the area during the early Christian period. The Columban monastery at Drumcliff was the largest centre of population from its foundation in 561 AD. The remains now consist of a High Cross and the only round tower in county Sligo. Another early church was at Kilmacowen.

By the early 12th century AD there was a bridge and a settlement in existence at the site of the present town.

A rath, or ringfort, called Rath na Bhritóg (Fort of the Britons) existed on what is now Holborn hill on the north side of the town, which is in the townland of Rathquarter. Rathedmond also has the remains of a large rath.

== Norman era ==
With the Norman invasion of Connacht in 1236 AD by the French speaking Cambro-Norman knights, known as Galls (Gauls) to the Irish came a new type of settlement. The Normans brought the European urban model based on trade and a money economy.

Sligo, accessible by sea, and a sheltered port was ideal for Norman military strategy as they, descendants of Vikings, relied on amphibious operations to supply and reinforce their armies.

The Normans took advantage of political divisions inherent in Cairbres position on the frontier between the ancient provinces of Ulster and Connacht. After the arrival of the justiciar (representative) of the King of England, Maurice Fitzgerald land was granted to the clergyman Clarus MacMailenn of Lough Cé intended for the construction of a hospital. The building materials were gathered, but the order was then switched to a castle by Fitzgerald, who having the upper hand, ordered the building of a castle to secure the position. Fedlim O'Conchobar, King of Connacht was ordered to build a castle by Maurice Fitzgerald, the Norman baron and warrior. Maurice used the castle as a base to invade Tir Conaill (Donegal).

The castle of Sligo was built by Mac Muiris FitzGerald, Justiciar of Ireland, and by the Sil Murray. For Fedlim O Conchobair, was bidden to build it at his own cost and to take the stones and lime of the spital house of the Trinity for the building, though the Justiciar had previously given that site to Clarus Mag Mailin in honour of the Holy Trinity.

— Annals of Connacht, 1245 AD

Warfare for control of Sligo castle was to become a constant feature from the building of the first castle in 1245, until the destruction of it which was still standing in 1691. (see Sligo Castle) The exact location and layout of Sligo castle remains unknown, as no trace now exists above ground. It is thought to have stood in Quay street, in the vicinity, or on the site of the present city hall. This area became known as Castlequarter.

The foundation of Sligo abbey, (actually a Dominican friary) in 1253 was followed by the clustering outside the abbey gates of houses of those providing services, or selling goods to the monks. The east side of the town surrounding the abbey became known as Abbeyquarter after The Holy Cross Dominican Friary. The Dominicans were a mendicant order, reliant on alms, and who preached to the poor of the towns. A monastery was built and a cemetery consecrated for the Preaching-friars in Sligo. This is the founding of the Abbey on Abbey street, Sligo town. The Preaching-friars marked out the site of another monastery at Ath Lethan.

In 1257 Maurice Fitzgerald was mortally wounded at the battle of Credran Cille to the north of the town near Ballincar. The Berminghams seized control of Tir Fhiacrach. Ultimately, the Normans failed to retain control of the area despite numerous efforts, and were permanently expelled by about 1315. They had nonetheless, succeeded in laying the foundations for the modern town of Sligo which retains certain Norman characteristics to this day. The High street with a flare and market cross is typical of Norman urban layouts, as are the narrow burgage plots running at right angles to many streets are typical of Norman architecture and planning. They also brought their extensive merchant contacts with England, France and Spain which enhanced the wine trade and led to the development of the medieval Sligo port.

== Gaelic era ==
Sligo is unique in Ireland as the only Norman medieval town to have been under Gaelic Irish control throughout the Medieval period, from around 1300 to 1600 AD. With the Europe wide slow down in urbanisation in the mid 14th century, and the Gaelic cultural resurgence, the town functioned as the centre of the Gaelic confederation of Íochtar Connacht.

Sligo town flourished during the Gaelic revival in the 14th and 15th centuries, trading with Galway and with French, Spanish and English merchants. Herring seems to have been an important commodity as it is mentioned in a Bristol sailors song of the early 15th century.

"Herring of Sligo and salmon of Bann, Has made in Bristol many a rich man".

At this time, Sligo was a prosperous trading port, exporting fish, wool, cow hide, and timber, while importing wine, salt and iron. Saffron was imported as well, for its use as a dye as well as indigo which is mentioned as a common colour for clothing in the Sligo area. The cocket of the port was a coveted income, much fought over between rival local dynasties.

Several merchants tower houses were built near the abbey and along Castle street. The Gaelic merchant family the O’Creans operated from Sligo.

"The town was burnt by O Domnaill, which was a pity buildings both of stone and wood were magnificent."

— Annals of the Four Masters

Horse races were held in the town in front of the castle at this time.

On Castle Point on the east side of Half Moon Bay at Annagh (Eanach) now known as Hazelwood is the site of a castle of O' Conchobar Sligigh. This area was the lucht tighe, household or demesne land of the chiefs of Cairbre Drom Cliabh. Sligo castle was in the hands of O Conor Sligo and was the “greatest i have seen in the hands of any Irishman” according to Henry Sidney.

The Leabhar na hUidhre, or Book of the Dun Cow, was kept in Sligo for 170 years after being taken from Tírconaill as ransom for the capture of the members of the clan who had been taken prisoner by Cathal Óg O'Connor.

The poet Tadg Dall O’hUiginn flourished at this time.

=== Elizabethan conquest ===
During the latter half of the 16th century, Sligo was targeted by the Elizabethan administration in Dublin as a strategic location for anyone attempting to control the northwest. The town now became caught between three different power blocs, the Earls of Clanricard to the west, the O'Donnell confederation Tírconaill to the north, and the Dublin government under the English Crown in the east. The town was destroyed during the Nine Years' War.

Under pressure from the O'Donnell's to the north, and the Clanricard Burkes to the south, in 1567, under the policy of surrender and regrant Domhnall O' Conchobar signed an agreement with Henry Sidney, agreeing to pay a set rent in exchange for protection. It was at this time that Sidney "shired" the area creating the English district known as County Sligo. As part of this agreement, O 'Connor had to allow a sheriff to operate in the county and the circuit court to administer according to English common law. Several sheriffs were killed trying to implement this.

In 1577 Sir Nicholas Malby, the English President of Connacht, reported that merchants based in Sligo had requested the building of town walls.

In 1588 three ships of the Spanish Armada's Levant squadron were lost off the coast of Streedagh beach in the north of the present county Sligo. The wreck-site was rediscovered in 1985. An account of the incident was written by the survivor Captain Francisco de Cuellar.

== 17th century ==
The town was granted a charter in 1613 under James I. it became the principal town of the newly created County of Sligo. This marked a new phase as a borough and colonial administrative centre of English rule. Initially, using the abbey because its stone walls were defensible, the new High Sheriff Sir Roger Jones, established the new county administration along what is now Teeling St. Later, a new fortified tower was built nearby, known as Jones castle. The present courthouse and Garda station are in the same location.

Remains of corner "flanker" of fortified house, uncovered 2006, possibly Jones' or Creans castle, Teeling St. Sligo

English gradually became the majority language in the town, but Irish remained the majority language of the county until the late nineteenth century.

=== 1641 rebellion ===
Unhappy with the changed power structure, the local Gaelic nobility rose up during the 1641 rebellion, reestablishing the Irish tuath system. This was to be the last time that Gaelic culture held sway over the region.

According to later depositions, a number of Protestant settlers within the town, were committed to the local gaol for their own safety, but were later allegedly massacred by a drunken mob.

Frederick Hamilton raided the town, burnt the abbey and executed the monks. The Parliamentary government built a new stone fort, on or near the site of the old castle, as well as an earthen star fort known as the Green fort on the hill north of the town. Fortifications were also built at the entrance to Sligo shipping channel on Oyster Island, guarding the route inland through Lough Gill on Church island.

=== Williamite wars ===
Sligo changed hands five times during the 1688-1691 Jacobite/Williamite wars. The town was fortified by the infamous soldier Henry Luttrell. The eccentric soldier, Sir Teague O'Regan, was the garrison commander for the Jacobite forces at Sligo. Patrick Sarsfield retook the town.

Notably, the last recorded use of a siege tower, known as a sow, in Britain or Ireland, was at the siege of the stone fort in Sligo during this war. It was used to assault the stone fort on Quay St. It was not a success as the hides used to cover the sides were not musket proof.

Despite the wars, Gaelic culture remained strong in the area. The poem book Leabhar Cloinne Aodha Buidhe was written in Sligo in 1680 for Cormac O’ Neill by the poet Rúairí Ó hUigínn.

== 18th century ==
18th century politics were dominated by the big landlords, mostly of military background, such as the Wynnes, who bought a 15,000 acre estate which included the town. The Wynnes seat at Hazelwood house was built in 1722 by Lieutenant General Owen Wynne after a design by Richard Cassels. Other large landowners were the Coopers of Markree, and the Gore Booths of Lissadell

The "Year of Destruction" (Bliain an Áir in Irish) struck in 1740. This was a famine, the famine of 1740 to 1741, which was caused by an unusually severe cold snap and devastated the population.

In Maynooth Irish MS B 8, Gaelic learning continued with Henry MacCarrick, a merchant and scholar of Sligo town, who lived on High street and copied the Cuimre na nGeneleach.

The town was heavily garrisoned in the 18th century, having four barracks, two horse and two foot. In 1794, Sligo was in turmoil with a campaign of agrarian violence by the Defenders

The forces of General Humbert, marched through Sligo county, during the 1798 Rebellion. They fought a battle at Collooney, in which the combined Irish and French force was victorious. Sligo town did not fall to the rebels, however, as Humbert overestimated the size of the garrison present and failed to march on it. The garrison was in fact preparing to abandon it. The Sligo Militia fought at the Battle of Vinegar Hill.

== 19th century ==
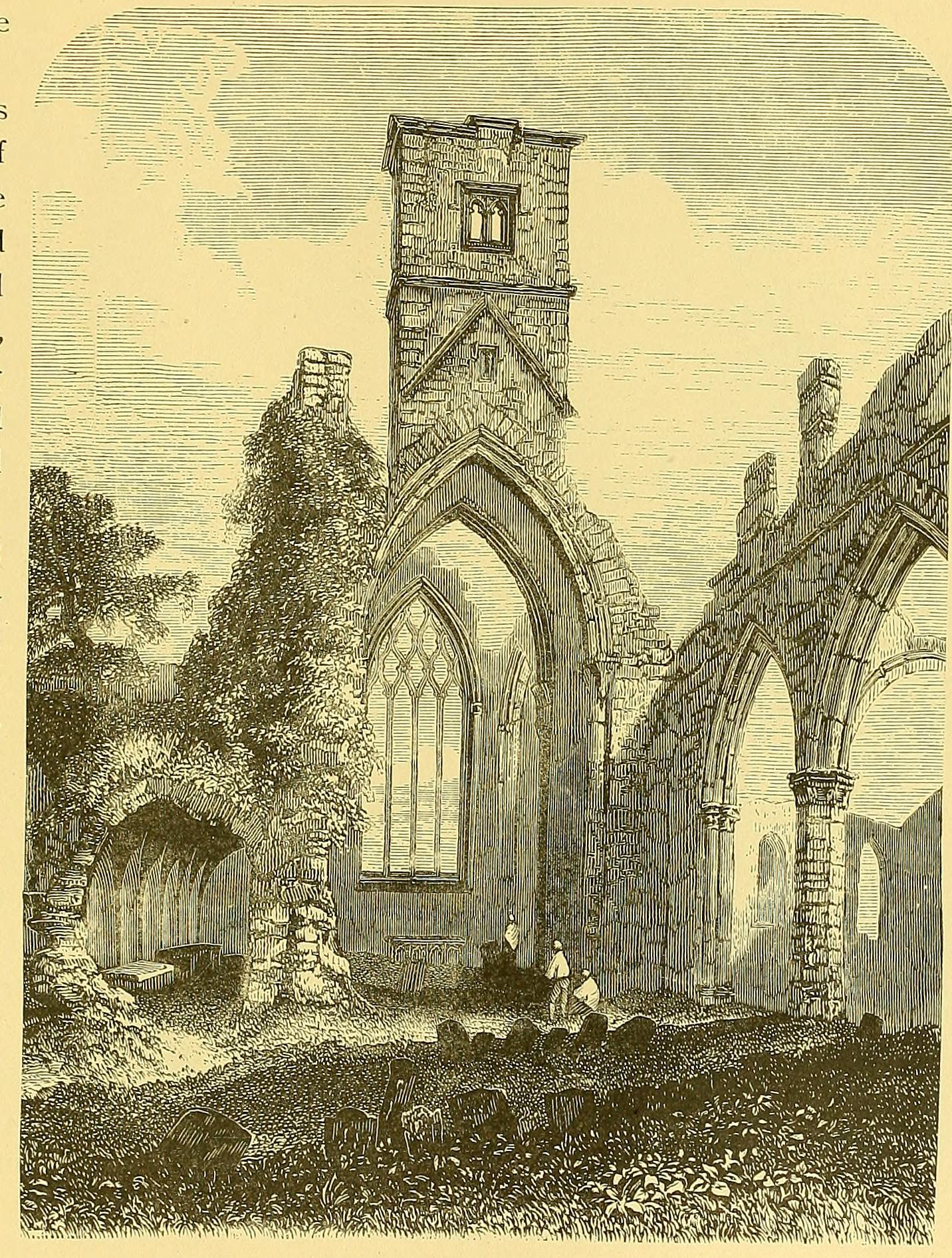
Ruins of Sligo Abbey (19th century drawing)

Sligo Port began to expand rapidly in the early 19th century. An example of the type of trade is shown by the shipwreck, on 4 November 1807, of the Portuguese brigantine Harmonia on voyage from Oporto to Sligo with cork, wine and oranges. She was driven ashore at Portreath Cornwall. Emigration was already a feature of the west of Ireland and Sligo port was a busy embarkation point. A shipping advertisement of 1834 for passage to Philadelphia, Baltimore, Boston, New Orleans, Quebec, Montreal and New York, declared

Notice to emigrants - Reduced rates of passage money to the United States and British America by way of Liverpool, with free passage to that port. Passengers on their arrival in Liverpool are requested to come direct to the office where every information will be given, and not to allow any person to interfere with them, for by so doing, they will save themselves the possibility of being taken in or imposed upon by the many unscrupulous persons prowling about the town...

The first steamship arrived in Sligo harbour in 1831 belonging to the Glasgow and Liverpool Steam Shipping Company. Messrs Middleton Pollexfen ran sailing ships to Glasgow and Liverpool from 1840 to 1856 when they replaced them with steamers. In 1865 they created the Sligo Steam Navigation Company which lasted until 1936.

Sligo gaol was constructed in 1818 based on the panopticon design of Jeremy Bentham.

=== Disease and famine ===
Sligo was badly affected by the 1832 Sligo cholera outbreak losing up to 2, 000 of its population. The fear and panic were vividly described by eyewitness Charlotte Blake-Thornley Stoker.

Prior to the famine, the population of county Sligo was 187,000 people, making it one of the densest populated areas in Ireland. Sligo was a major transit port for emigration, during An Gorta Mór (The Great Famine). In 1846, 11,000 emigrated through the port. Some of the worst coffin ships on record left from Sligo port. On the 9th of August 1847 the vessel Bark Larch arrived at the quarantine station at Grosse Isle, Canada from Sligo with 440 on board, of these, 150 were sick and 108 were dead. This was by far the worst ship at the port that day. Lord Palmerston, who held large estates in the county, achieved notoriety with his Assisted Emigrants scheme.

In 1871 between 25% and 50% of the county still spoke Irish as a first language; the county remained rural in character with over 70% involved in agriculture. Landlords controlled almost all aspects of life. The town was on the lands of the Wynne estate based at Hazelwood house.

Sligo experienced rapid industrialisation during the 19th century, with many public buildings erected during this era including the town hall, Ulster bank, courthouse.

The Local Government (Ireland) Act 1898 extended the franchise, resulting in the election of a nationalist council.

However, business and government posts remained almost exclusively in the hands of Protestants, and the struggle for equality of opportunity was to become a feature of the next century.

North Sligo MP P A McHugh was a nationalist and champion of workers rights until his death in 1909.

== 20th century ==
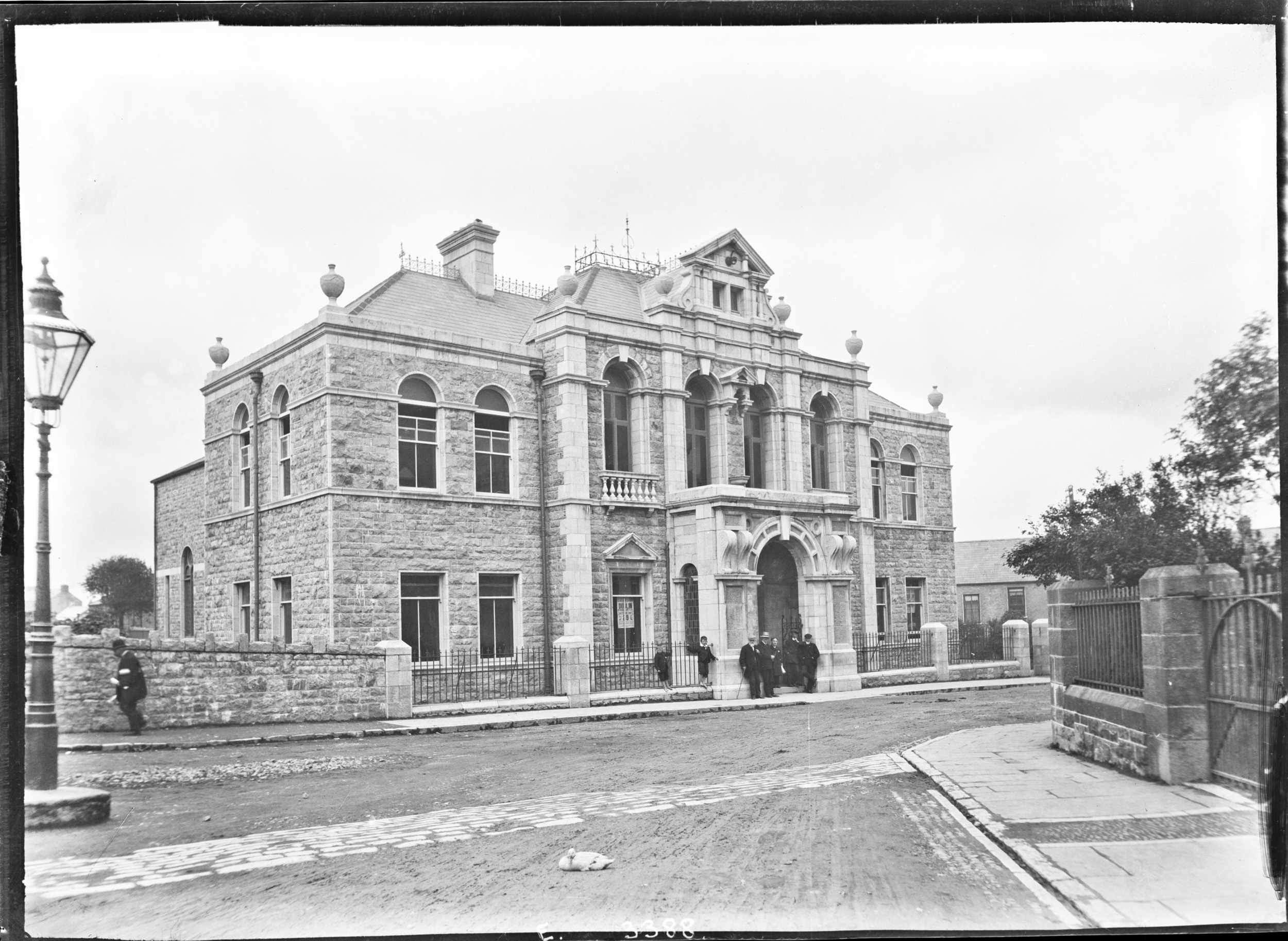
Temperance Hall in Sligo (1902)

=== Labour movement and strikes ===
The rapid industrialisation of Sligo, unusual for the west coast, meant that conditions for the working poor were very bad. Houses and businesses were without sanitation facilities. In 1915 the death rate from tuberculosis was 3.4 per 1,000, almost double that of the rest of the country. Indicative of conditions at the time are the reports of a 1901 Local Government Inspector who noted for Corkrans Mall a

Slaughter house with large manure heap inside, diapidated, badly drained, and lying below the level of an adjoining cemetery. A number of cattle and horses kept here, () Six houses in this row.

Trade unions were successful in the early 1900s and flourished between the years 1910 and 1914. In 1911 the ITGWU began organising workers in the town into a unified bloc after the Sligo Trades Council invited Walter Carpenter to speak. So successful was this that Sligo workers won a major strike in 1912, and won again in 1913 when employers tried to break the unions, resulting in the 1913 Sligo Dock strike. Other achievements of the Trades Council included a 50% pay rise for Corporation workers, victory in a cabinetmakers strike, better conditions for women workers, bakers and tailors. By 1914 it was acknowledged by the county Inspector that the “ITGWU was in complete control of the docks”. Sligo Corporation was also almost entirely made up of Labour candidates in 1913 and 1914 and an ITGWU councillor was elected mayor. Sligo Traded Council had been active since 1895.

=== Politics ===
In the 1919 election, Sligo became the first municipality in Britain or Ireland to use the PR-STV (proportional representation/single transferable vote) voting system.

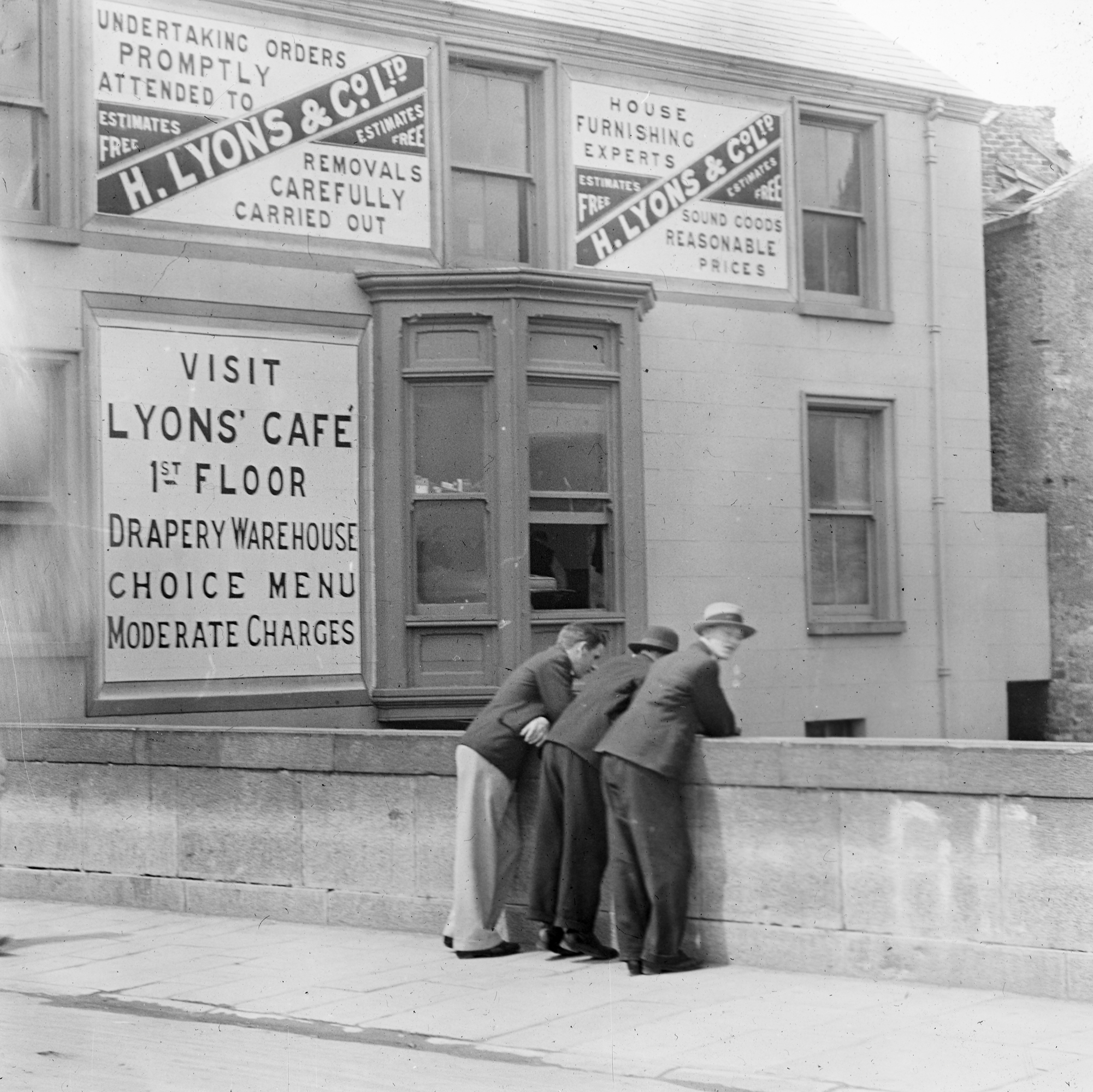
Street scene in Sligo c. 1920s

== Free State and Republic ==
Partition cut the town off from an extensive part of its hinterland in west Fermanagh and south Tyrone and trading contacts with Enniskillen and Belfast.

Sligo, whilst not directly on the border, was affected indirectly by the Troubles in Northern Ireland.
