= Sligo Castle =

Irish castle

Sligo Castle (Irish: Caisleán Sligigh) was a Norman era castle built in 1245 in Sligo Town in Connacht in the west of Ireland. The castle is no longer extant but it was of great importance in the history of the West of Ireland. It is mentioned in the annals numerous times.

== Location ==
The location is currently not certain, although it is thought to be on the site of the present Sligo Town Hall on Quay Street. An image exists painted by a military surveyor in 1688. Ruins in the area of have become known locally as Castle Connor. Castle Connor and Sligo Castle may be one and the same with the current ruins having been rebuilt on the original site in 1520 by Connor O'Dowd. Although some sources indicate that this may be a separate castle built in a separate location, as the history of the area is difficult to decipher.

== History ==
After the arrival of the justiciar (representative) of the King of England, Maurice Fitzgerald land was granted to the clergyman Clarus MacMailenn of Lough Cé intended for the construction of a hospital. The building materials were gathered but the order was then switched to a castle by Fitzgerald, who having the upper hand, ordered the building of a castle to secure the position. Fedlim O'Conchobar, King of Connacht was ordered to build a castle by Maurice Fitzgerald, the Norman baron and warrior. Maurice used the castle as a base to invade Tir Conaill (Donegal).

"The castle of Sligo was built by Mac Muiris FitzGerald, Justiciar of Ireland, and by the Sil Murray. For Fedlim O Conchobair was bidden to build it at his own cost and to take the stones and lime of the spital house of the Trinity for the building, though the Justiciar had previously given that site to Clarus Mag Mailin in honour of the Holy Trinity." (Annals of Connacht, 1245)

On 9 December 1294, after the forces of Richard de Burgh, Earl of Ulster, destroyed Sligo castle, John fitz Thomas captured the earl, and imprisoned him in Lea castle for three months until he relinquished all authority over fitz Thomas in Connacht. Fitz Thomas was summoned before King Edward I the following July and allowed to return home only after agreeing to strict conditions of behavior.

In the 1530s, the O'Conors Sligo held the rebuilt castle "...but generally in subjection to the O'Donnells, princes of Tyrconnell, to whom that castle, and the territory of Carbury in Sligo originally belonged."

A stone fort was built on the site after the 1641 rebellion.

It was described by soldiers during the siege of 1691 as "the crazie castle".
