= Sligo =

Sligo Sligeach (Irish)
- Town
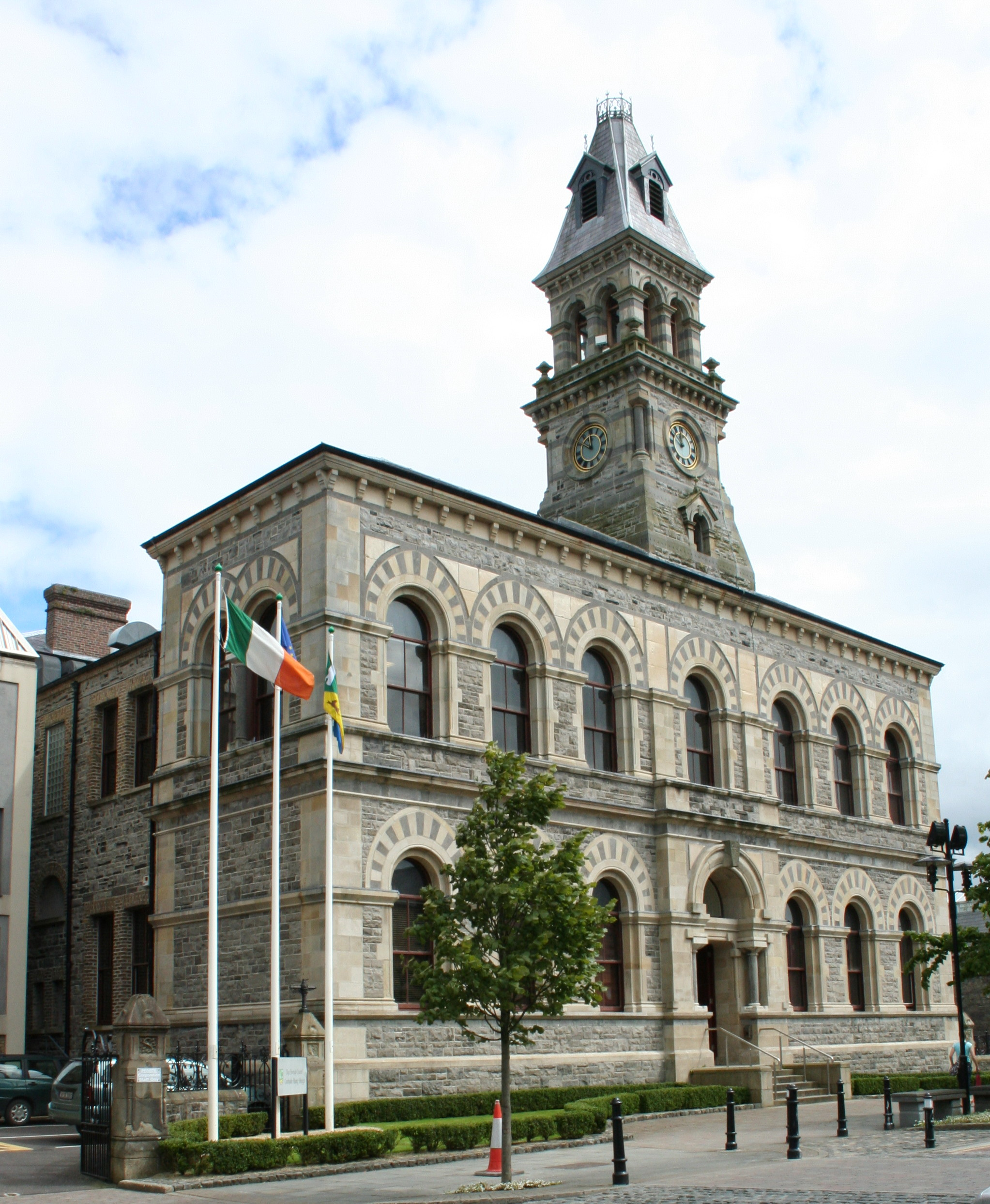
- Sligo Town Hall

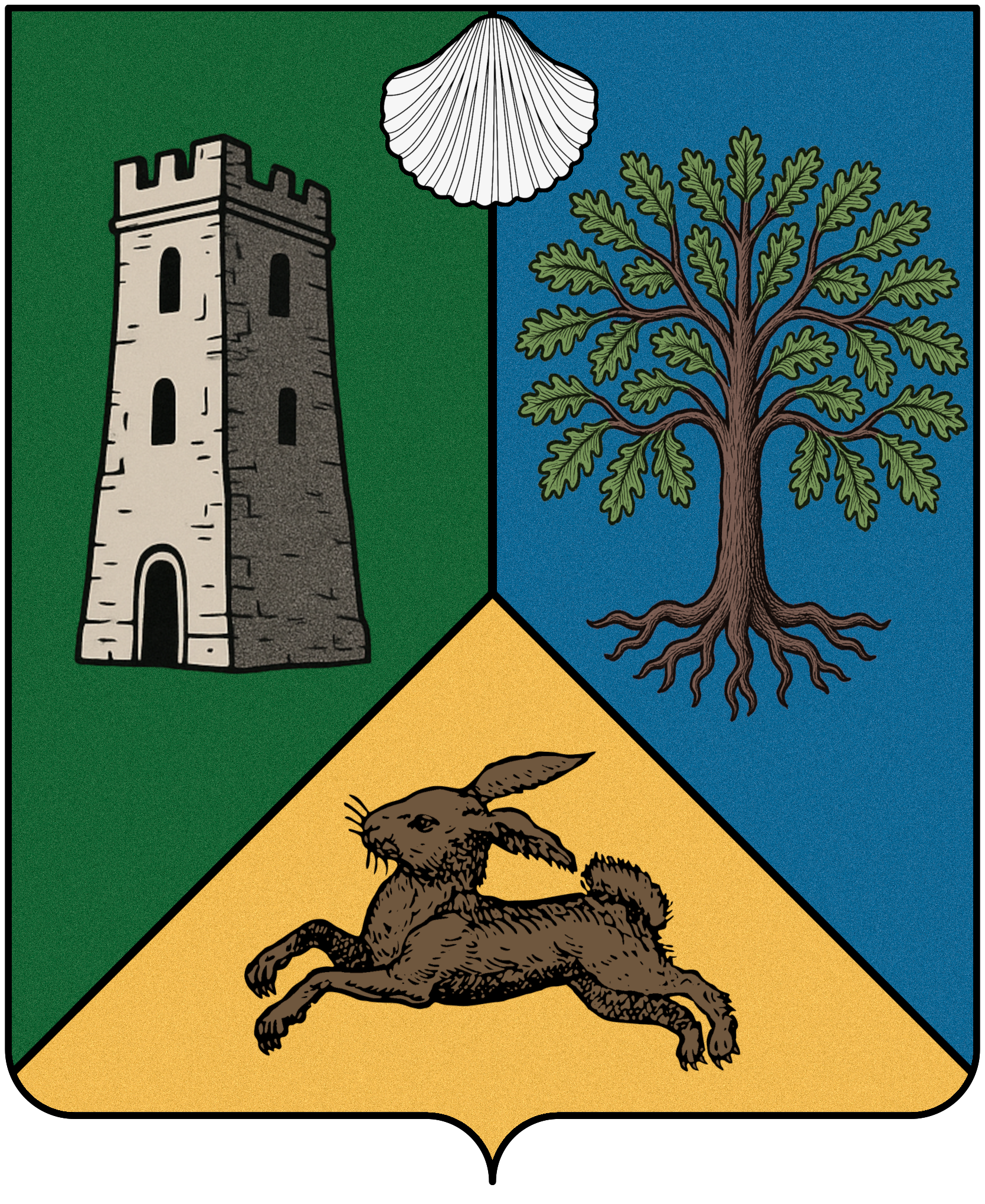
- Coat of arms

- Sligo in Ireland Sligo (Europe)
- Coordinates: 54.2667°N 8.4833°W
- Country: Ireland
- Province: Connacht
- County: County Sligo
- Barony: Carbury
- Dáil constituency: Sligo–Leitrim
- EU Parliament: Midlands–North-West

Area
  - Total: 10.3 km^{2} (4.0 sq mi)
- Elevation: 13 m (43 ft)

Population (2022)
  - Total: 20,608
  - Density: 2,000/km^{2} (5,180/sq mi)
- Eircode (Postcode) District: F91
- Irish Grid Reference: G685354
- Dialing code: +353 71
- Website: www.sligoborough.ie

Sligo (/ˈslaɪɡoʊ/; Irish: Sligeach [ˈʃl̠ʲɪɟəx]; lit. 'abounding in shells') is a coastal seaport and the county town of County Sligo, Ireland, within the western province of Connacht. With a population of 20,608 in 2022, it is the county's largest urban centre (constituting 29.5% of the county's population) and the 24th largest in the Republic of Ireland.

Sligo is a commercial and cultural centre situated on the west coast of Ireland. Its surrounding coast and countryside, as well as its connections to the poet W. B. Yeats, have made it a tourist destination.

== History ==
=== Etymology ===
Sligo is the anglicisation of the Irish name Sligeach, meaning "abounding in shells" or "shelly place". It refers to the abundance of shellfish found in the river and its estuary, and from the extensive shell middens in the vicinity. The river now known as the Garavogue (Irish: An Gharbhóg), perhaps meaning "little torrent", was originally called the Sligeach. It is listed as one of the seven "royal rivers" of Ireland in the ninth century AD tale The Destruction of Da Dergas Hostel. The river Slicech is also referenced in the Annals of Ulster in 1188.

The Ordnance Survey letters of 1836 state that "cart loads of shells were found underground in many places within the town where houses now stand". The whole area, from the river estuary at Sligo, around the coast to the river at Ballysadare Bay, is rich in marine resources which were utilised as far back as the Mesolithic period.

=== Early history ===
The importance of Sligo's location in prehistory is demonstrated by the abundance of ancient sites close by and even within the town. For example, Sligo town's first roundabout was constructed around a megalithic passage tomb at Abbeyquarter North in Garavogue Villas. This is an outlier of the large group of monuments at Carrowmore on the Coolera Peninsula on the western outskirts of the town. The area around Sligo town has one of the highest densities of prehistoric archaeological sites in Ireland, and is the only place in which all classes of Irish megalithic monuments are to be found together. Knocknarea mountain, capped by the great cairn of Miosgan Maeve, dominates the skyline to the west of the town. Cairns Hill on the southern edge of the town also has two very large stone cairns.

Excavations for the National Roads Authority (NRA) for the N4 Sligo Inner Relief Road in 2002 revealed an early Neolithic causewayed enclosure. Built around 4000 B.C., the Magheraboy causewayed enclosure is located on high ground overlooking the town from the south. This is the oldest causewayed enclosure so far discovered in Britain or Ireland. It consists of a large area enclosed by a segmented ditch and palisade, and was perhaps an area of commerce and ritual. These monuments are associated with the coming of agriculture and hence the first farmers in Ireland. According to archaeologist Edward Danagher, who excavated the site, "Magheraboy indicates a stable and successful population during the final centuries of the fifth millennium and the first centuries of the fourth millennium BC". Danagher's work also documented a Bronze Age Henge at Tonafortes (beside the Carraroe roundabout) on the southern outskirts of Sligo town.

Sligo Bay is an ancient natural harbour, being known to Greek, Phoenician and Roman traders as the area is thought by some to be the location marked as the city of Nagnata on Claudius Ptolemy's second century A.D. co-ordinate map of the world. During the early medieval period, the site of Sligo was eclipsed by the importance of the great monastery founded by Columcille 5 miles to the north at Drumcliff. By the 12th century, there was a bridge and a small settlement in existence at the site of the present town.

=== Medieval history ===
The Norman knight Maurice Fitzgerald, the Justiciar of Ireland, is generally credited with the establishment of the medieval European-style town and port of Sligo, building Sligo Castle in 1245. The annalists refer to the town as a sraidbhaile ('street settlement') which seems to have consisted of the castle and an attached defensive bawn in the vicinity of Quay street. A Dominican Friary (Blackfriars) was also founded by Maurice Fitzgerald and the King of Connacht, Felim mac Cathal Crobderg Ua Conchobair, in 1253. This was accidentally destroyed by fire in 1414, and was subsequently rebuilt in its present form by Tighernan O’Rourke. Norman hegemony was, however, not destined to last long in Sligo. The Norman advance was halted in Sligo after the battle of Credran Cille in 1257 at Ros Ceite (Rosses Point) between Godfrey O'Donnell, Lord of Tirconnell, and Maurice Fitzgerald. Both commanders were mortally wounded in single combat. The Norman invasion of Tír Chonaill was abandoned after this. In 1289 a survey indicates there were 180 burgesses in the town. The Normans had laid a foundation that was to last.

The town is unique in Ireland in that it is the only Norman-founded Irish town to have been under almost continuous native Irish control throughout the Medieval period. Despite Anglo-Norman attempts to retake it, it became the administrative centre of the O'Conor Sligo (O'Conchobar Sligigh) confederation of Iochtar Connacht (Lower Connacht) by 1315 AD. Also called Clan Aindrias, the O 'Conors were a branch of the O'Conchobar dynasty of Kings of Connacht. It continued to develop within the túath (Irish territory) of Cairbre Drom Cliabh becoming the effective centre of the confederation of túatha. The other Irish túatha subject to here were Tír Fhíacrach Múaidhe, Luighne Connacht, Tir Olliol and Corann. Throughout this time Sligo was under the system of Fénechus (Brehon) law and was ruled by the Gaelic system of an elected Rí túath (territory king/lord), and an assembly known as an oireacht.

Through competition between Gaelic dynasties for the lucrative port duties of Sligo, the town was burned, sacked or besieged approximately 49 times during the medieval period, according to the annals of Ireland. These raids seem to have had little effect on the development of the town, as by the mid-15th century the town and port had grown in importance. It traded with Galway, Bristol, France and Spain. Amongst the earliest preserved specimens of written English in Connacht is a receipt for 20 marks, dated August 1430, paid by Saunder Lynche and Davy Botyller, to Henry Blake and Walter Blake, customers of "ye King and John Rede, controller of ye porte of Galvy and of Slego".

Sligo continued under Gaelic control until the late 16th century when, during the Elizabethan conquest, it was selected as the county town for the newly shired County of Sligo. An order was sent by the Elizabethan Government to Sir Nicholas Malby, Knight, wanting him to establish "apt and safe" places for the keeping of the Assizes & Sessions, with walls of lime & stone, in each county of Connacht, "judging that the aptest place be in Sligo, for the County of Sligo…" The walls were never built.

=== 17th and 18th centuries ===
Sligo Abbey, actually a Dominican Friary, although a ruin, is the only medieval building left standing in the town. Much of the structure, including the choir, carved altar (the only one in situ in Ireland) and cloisters, remains. When Sir Frederick Hamilton's Parliamentarian soldiers partially sacked Sligo in 1642, the Friary was burned and many friars killed.

During the Williamite War (1689–91) the town was fought over between the Jacobite Irish Army loyal to James II and Williamite forces. Patrick Sarsfield was able to capture the town and repulsed a Williamite attack to retake it; however, Sligo was later surrendered to forces under the command of Arthur Forbes, 1st Earl of Granard.

In 1798, a mixed force of the Limerick Militia, Essex Fencibles and local yeomanry under a Colonel Vereker were defeated at the battle of Carricknagat at Collooney by the combined Irish and French forces under General Humbert. A street in the town is named after the hero of this battle Bartholomew Teeling. The Lady Erin monument at Market Cross was erected in 1899 to mark the centenary of the 1798 Rebellion.

=== 19th century ===
The town suffered badly from a cholera outbreak in 1832. Scholars speculate that Bram Stoker, whose mother Charlotte Blake Thornley was probably (there are no records and the family lived in both Sligo and Ballyshannon) born in Sligo in 1818 and experienced the epidemic first hand, was influenced by her stories when he wrote his novel Dracula. The family lived on Correction Street in the town. After fleeing to Ballyshannon, Charlotte wrote:

At the end of that time, we were able to live in peace till the plague had abated and we could return to Sligo. There, we found the streets grass-grown and five-eighths of the population dead. We had great reason to thank God who had spared us.

— Charlotte Thornley Stoker

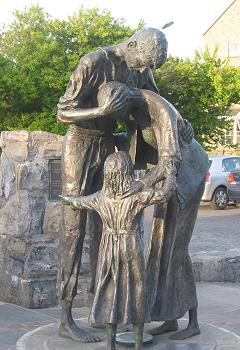
Sligo Famine Memorial on the quays

The Great Famine between 1847 and 1851 caused over 30,000 people to emigrate through the port of Sligo. On the Quays, overlooking the Garavogue River, is a cast bronze memorial to the emigrants. This is one of a suite of three sculptures commissioned by the Sligo Famine Commemoration Committee to honour the victims of the Great Famine.

A plaque in the background tells one family's sad story:

I am now, I may say, alone in the world. All my brothers and sisters are dead and children but yourself... We are all ejected out of Mr. Enright's ground... The times was so bad and all Ireland in such a state of poverty that no person could pay rent. My only hope now rests with you, as I am without one shilling and as I said before I must either beg or go to the poorhouse... I remain your affectionate father, Owen Larkin. Be sure answer this by return of post.

— 'Letter to America, 2 January 1850'

=== 20th century ===
The early years of the century saw much industrial unrest as workers in the Port of Sligo fought for better pay and conditions. This resulted in two major strikes, in 1912 and, in 1913 the prolonged Sligo dock strike. Both ended in victory for the workers.

Sligo Town was heavily garrisoned by the British Army during the War of Independence. For this reason IRA activity was limited to actions such as harassment, sabotage and jailbreaks. At various times during the war, prominent Republicans were held at the Sligo Gaol. The commander of IRA forces in Sligo was Liam Pilkington.

Arthur Griffith spoke in April 1922 on the corner of O'Connell Street and Grattan Street. To this day it is known as Griffith's Corner. During the Civil War, Sligo railway station was blown up by Anti-Treaty forces on 10 January 1923.

In 1961, St. John the Baptist's Church became a cathedral of the Church of Ireland Diocese of Kilmore, Elphin and Ardagh after St. Mary's Cathedral in Elphin was abandoned, having been destroyed by a storm four years previously.

== Geography ==
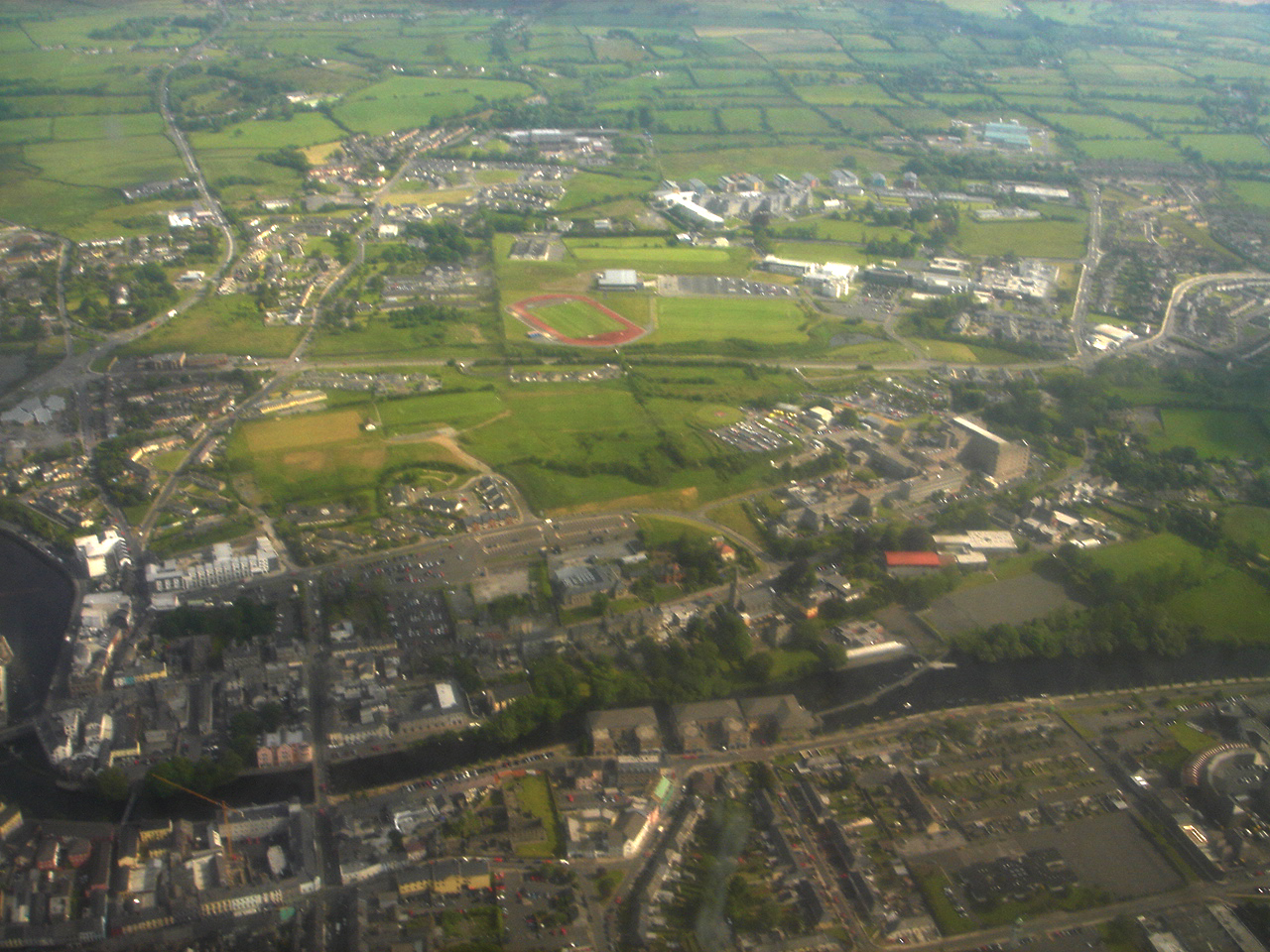
Aerial view of north Sligo town in 2007

Situated on a coastal plain facing the Atlantic Ocean, Sligo is located on low gravel hills on the banks of the Garavogue River between Lough Gill and the estuary of the Garavogue river leading to Sligo Bay. The town is surrounded on three sides by an arc of mountains, with the Ox Mountain ridges of Slieve Daeane and Killery Mountain to the southeast bordering Lough Gill. The flat topped limestone plateaux of Cope's, Keelogyboy and Castlegal Mountains to the north and northeast and the singular hill of Knocknarea with its Neolithic cairn to the west and the distinctive high plateau of Benbulben to the north.

Sligo is an important bridging point on the main north–south route between Ulster and Connacht. It is the county town of County Sligo and is in the Barony of Carbury (formerly the Gaelic túath of Cairbre Drom Cliabh). Sligo is the diocesan seat of the Roman Catholic Diocese of Elphin. It is in the Church of Ireland Diocese of Kilmore, Elphin and Ardagh.

County Sligo is one of the counties that make up the province of Connacht. The county is part of the Border Region due to the fact that part of North Sligo is relatively close to 'the Border'. The Border Region in the Republic of Ireland has a population of over 500,000 people and consists of the counties of Cavan, Donegal, Leitrim, Louth and Monaghan.

=== Architecture ===
The town consists of a medieval core street layout, but with mainly 19th-century buildings, many of which are of architectural merit. The town has a High Street which descends from the south of the town and terminates in a market flare at the Market Cross, a pattern typical of Norman street layouts. Here it meets the east west road leading from the Abbeyquarter on the east side to St. Johns Cathedral to the west. This seems to have been the first street laid out in the town. Burgage plots of Norman origin are also evident in the long narrow property boundaries typical of the centre of the town.

The only surviving medieval building is Sligo Holy Cross Dominican Friary built in 1252. An arched tower and three sided cloister of the Abbey Church still survive. The next oldest extant building is the Cathedral of St Mary the Virgin and St. John the Baptist on John Street. The current building dates from 1730 when it was designed by the German architect Richard Cassels who was visiting to design Hazelwood House. The cathedral contains four memorials to the Pollexfen family, maternal relatives of W. B. Yeats.

In the nineteenth century, Sligo experienced rapid economic growth and therefore architectural change was rapid. This was marked by the erection of many public buildings. These include Sligo Town Hall, designed by William Hague in a Lombardo-Romanesque style. Sligo Courthouse on Teeling street is an asymmetrical Neo-Gothic building designed by Rawson Carroll and built in 1878. The Gilooly Memorial Hall is an austere building on Temple Street built as a memorial to the Temperance campaigner Bishop Gillooly. His statue above the door bears the inscription "Ireland sober, is Ireland free". The Model School, now the Model Arts & Niland Gallery, was built by James Owen of the Board of Works to provide education to all denominations between 1857 and 1863, it was to serve as a model for other schools throughout the country.

The former Batchelors factory on Deep Water Quay is an industrial building which was built in 1905 as a maize mill and grain silo, and used an innovative construction method invented by François Hennebique in 1892. It is one of the earliest examples of its type in Ireland.

=== Climate ===
Sligo's climate is classified, like all of Ireland, as temperate oceanic. It is characterised by high levels of precipitation and a narrow annual temperature range. The mean yearly temperature is 9.7 °C (49 °F). The mean January temperature is 5.3 °C (42 °F), while the mean July temperature is 14.7 °C (58 °F). On average, the driest months are April to June while the wettest months are October to January.

Rainfall averages 1303 mm (51.3 in) per year. The high rainfall means Sligo is in the temperate rainforest biome, examples of which exist around Lough Gill. The lowest temperature ever recorded in Ireland was −19.1 °C (−2.4 °F) at Markree Castle, County Sligo, on 16 January 1881.

Climate data for Sligo
Month	Jan	Feb	Mar	Apr	May	Jun	Jul	Aug	Sep	Oct	Nov	Dec	Year
Mean daily maximum °C (°F)	7.4 (45.3)	8.0 (46.4)	9.5 (49.1)	11.9 (53.4)	14.6 (58.3)	16.7 (62.1)	17.6 (63.7)	17.4 (63.3)	16.0 (60.8)	12.9 (55.2)	9.7 (49.5)	7.7 (45.9)	12.4 (54.4)
Daily mean °C (°F)	5.3 (41.5)	5.5 (41.9)	6.5 (43.7)	8.5 (47.3)	11.2 (52.2)	13.5 (56.3)	14.7 (58.5)	14.5 (58.1)	13.1 (55.6)	10.3 (50.5)	7.5 (45.5)	5.6 (42.1)	9.7 (49.4)
Mean daily minimum °C (°F)	3.1 (37.6)	3.1 (37.6)	3.6 (38.5)	5.1 (41.2)	7.7 (45.9)	10.2 (50.4)	11.8 (53.2)	11.7 (53.1)	10.3 (50.5)	7.8 (46.0)	5.2 (41.4)	3.5 (38.3)	6.9 (44.5)
Average precipitation mm (inches)	111.7 (4.40)	99.2 (3.91)	94.0 (3.70)	83.7 (3.30)	109.4 (4.31)	108.4 (4.27)	119.2 (4.69)	122.7 (4.83)	99.2 (3.91)	124.9 (4.92)	114.3 (4.50)	116.0 (4.57)	1,302.7 (51.31)
Source: Weather.Directory

== Demographics ==
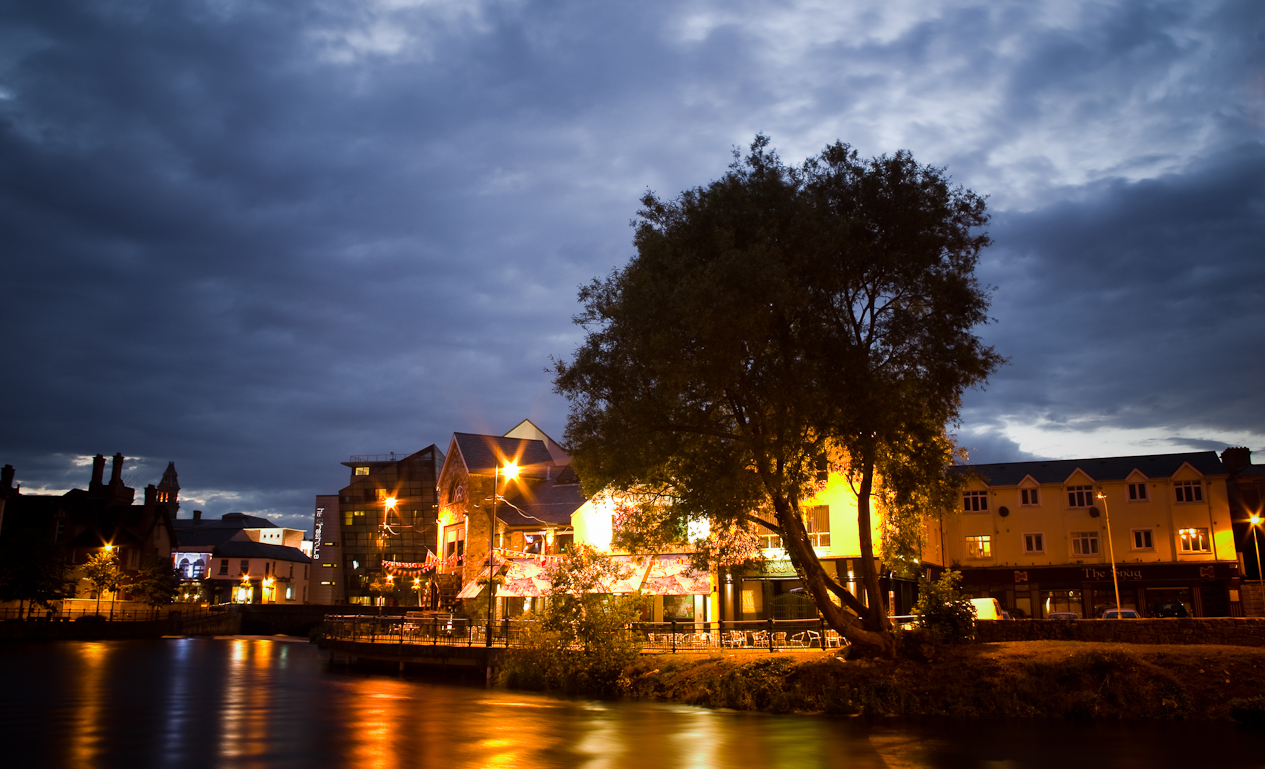
Sligo at night

Sligo had a population of 19,199 in 2016 and 20,608 in 2022, a growth of 7.3% according to the census.

From the 2022 population, 9,969 were males and 10,639 females. Irish citizens made up 79.6% of the population with Polish (542 persons or 2.6%), British (311, 1.5%) and Indian (255, 1.2%) as the next largest declared citizenships. People from other EU countries (674, 3.3%) and those from elsewhere outside the EU (978, 4.7%) were also noted.

6,522 persons could speak the Irish language. 3,410 persons spoke a language other than Irish or English at home and, of these, Polish was the most common foreign language spoken at home, with 744 speakers.

== Religion ==
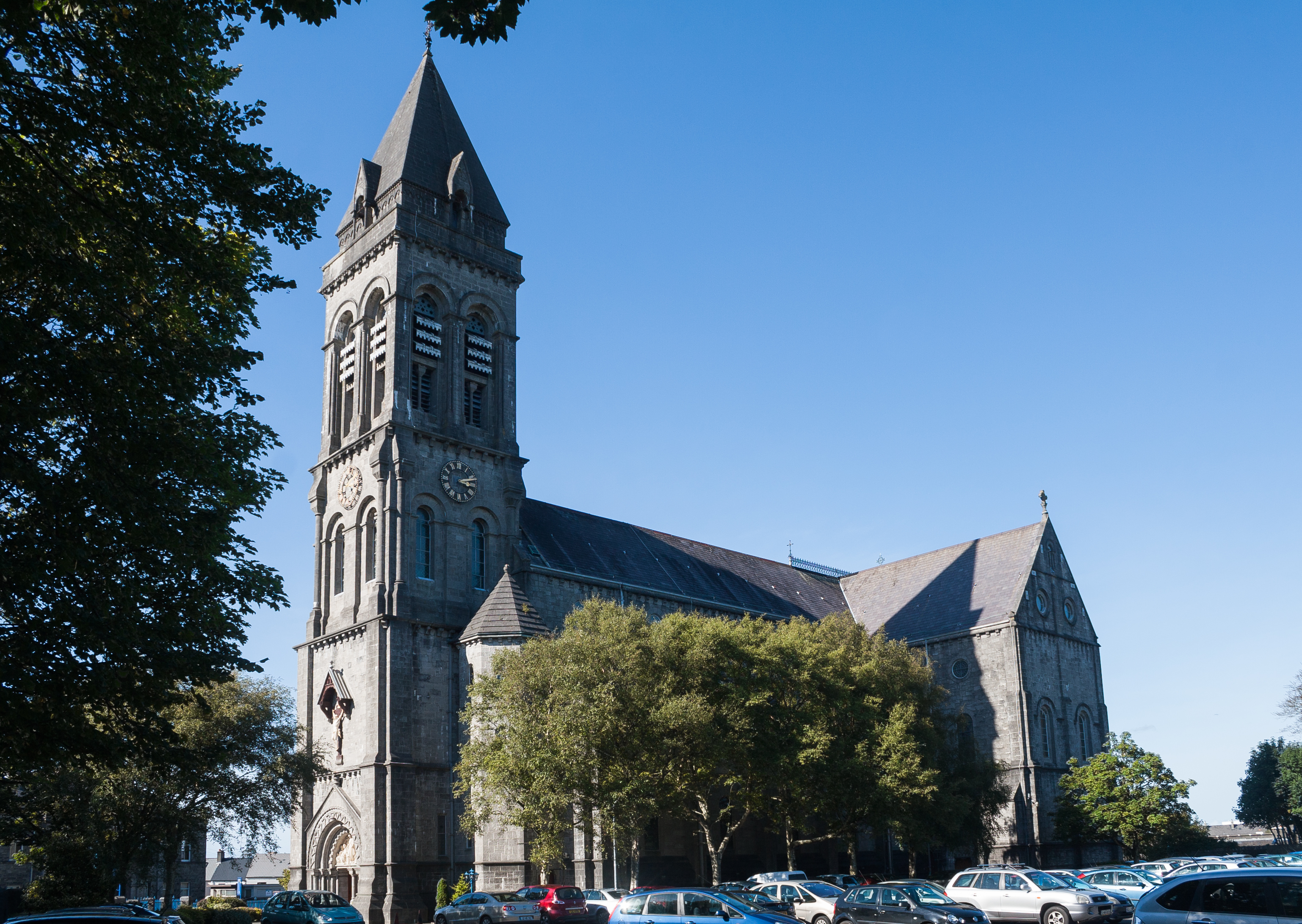
Cathedral of the Immaculate Conception

In the 2022 census, 13,226 residents (64.2%) identified their religion as Roman Catholic or Lapsed (Roman) Catholic. A further 791 (3.8%) identified as Islamic, 469 (2.3%) as Church of Ireland, Church of England, Anglican or Episcopalian and 242 as Orthodox (Greek, Coptic or Russian). 3,100 persons (15.0%) indicated that they had no religion, and a further 1,937 (9.4%) did not state any religion.

Sligo is located in the Roman Catholic Diocese of Elphin. The main church of the diocese is the Cathedral of the Immaculate Conception which is located on Temple Street. Other Catholic churches in the town are St. Anne's Church, Cranmore and St. Joseph's Church, Ballytivnan.

The town is also part of the Church of Ireland United Diocese of Kilmore, Elphin and Ardagh. The primary church in the diocese is the St John the Baptist Cathedral, Sligo which is located on John Street. Sligo Presbyterian Church is located on Church Street and Sligo Methodist Church is located on Wine Street. There is also a small Baptist church at Cartron Village, Rosses Point Road.

The Sligo-Leitrim Islamic Cultural Centre (SLICC) is located on Mail Coach Road. The Indian Malankara Orthodox Syrian Church meets at the St. Johns Hospital Chapel, Benbullen Rehabilitation Unit, Ballytivan.

== Economy ==
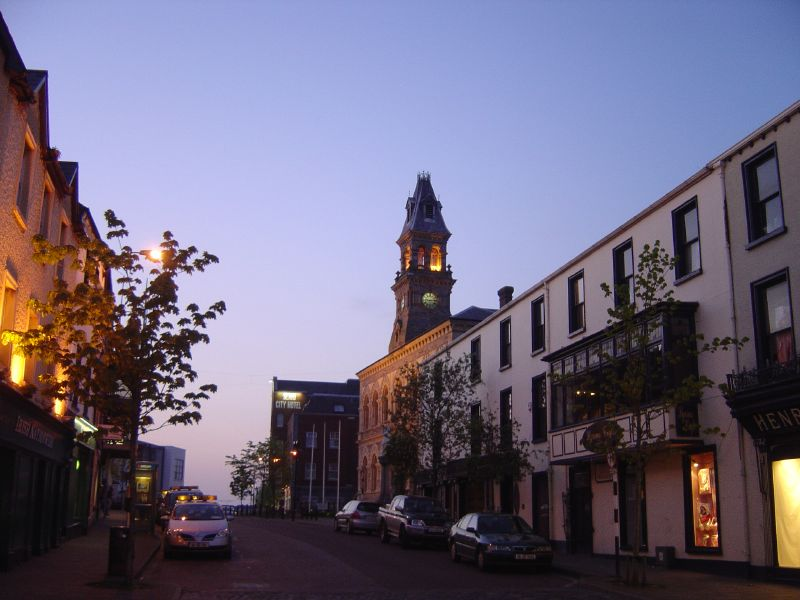
Sligo Town at dusk

Sligo is in the Northern and Western Region, a NUTS 2 region classified as an underdeveloped "region in transition" by the EU Commission. This is an area where GDP is from 75% to 90% of the EU average. It is entitled to funding from European Regional Development Fund (ERDF) Operational Programmes, which are administered by the Northern and Western Regional Assembly. Sligo Town is part of the NUTS 3 Border Region, which recognises that part of north County Sligo is relatively close to the border with Northern Ireland. A study by the European Committee of the Regions found that the Border Region was the most exposed in Europe to the economic effects of Brexit.

Sligo is a major services and shopping centre within this region. As of 2016 the service sector is the primary employment sector in the county, employing 18,760 (71.7%) of workforce. Industry and construction makes up 17% (4,427) of employment, and agriculture, forestry and fishing 7.2% (1,868). The total number employed is 26,002. 3,843 people are employed in agency assisted (IDA) companies. Sligo borough labour catchment as of 2016 is 21,824. 92% of enterprises in Sligo are micro-enterprises of 10 or fewer employees.

Sligo has traditionally been a centre for the tool-making industry.

The pharmaceutical industry is significant with several companies producing goods for this sector, including Abbott (Ireland) Ltd, which is among the largest employers in Sligo.

Development has occurred along the River Garavogue with the regeneration of J.F.K. Parade (2000), Rockwood Parade (1993–1997), and The Riverside (1997–2006), as well as two new footbridges over the river, one on Rockwood Parade (1996) and one on The Riverside (1999). Sligo has a number of independent shops and shopping malls, and there is a retail park on the town's outskirts at Carraroe.

== Culture ==
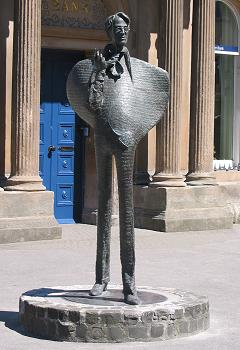
Statue of W. B. Yeats outside the former Ulster Bank building in Sligo Town.

The culture of County Sligo, especially of North Sligo, was an inspiration for both poet and Nobel laureate W. B. Yeats and his brother, the artist and illustrator Jack Butler Yeats. A collection of Jack B. Yeats's art is housed in The Niland Gallery, part of the Model centre on The Mall in Sligo. The Yeats Summer School takes place every year in the town.

Sligo town has connections with Goon Show star and writer Spike Milligan, whose father was from Sligo, and a plaque was unveiled at the former Milligan family home on Sligo's Holborn Street.

=== Traditional Irish music ===
Traditional Irish music sessions are held in several venues in the town.

In the early 13th century, the poet and crusader Muireadhach Albanach Ó Dálaigh kept a school of poetry at Lissadell on the Maugherow Peninsula, north of Sligo Town. He was Ollamh Fileadh (High Poet) to the Ó Domhnaill kings of Tír Chonaill. The school appears to have been dissolved after the Norman invasion. In the 16th century, the poet Tadhg Dall Ó hÚigínn wrote many praise poems in strict Dán Díreach metre for local chiefs and patrons such as the O'Conor Sligo. He was killed for a satire he wrote on the O'Haras. The annals record the death in 1561 of Naisse mac Cithruadh, the "most eminent musician that was in Éireann", by drowning on Lough Gill.

In the 17th century, two brothers from County Sligo, Thomas and William Connellan from Cloonamahon, were among the last of the great Irish bards and harpists. Thomas is the author of the tune Molly MacAlpin, now known as Carolan's Dream, and William may have written Love is a Tormenting Pain and Killiecrankie.

Traditional musicians from Sligo active in the early 20th century include Michael Coleman, James Morrison and Paddy Killoran.

=== Festivals ===
Sligo hosts several festivals throughout the year, including Sligo Live, occurring every October; the Sligo Summer Festival, which celebrated the 400th anniversary of Sligo town; and the Fleadh Cheoil, which the town hosted in three consecutive years (1989, 1990 and 1991) and again in 2014 and 2015. Approximately 400,000 people attended the 2014 and 2015 festivals. During the festival, much of the music was played by musicians on the streets of Sligo.

The Sligo Jazz Project is held every July. Another annual festival, the Sligo Festival of Baroque Music, was started in 1995 and takes place on the last weekend of September.

The Garavogue River and Rockwood Parade (right)

=== Theatre ===
Sligo also has a tradition of theatre, both professional and amateur. Sligo has had a theatre at least as far back as 1750, according to Wood-Martins' History of Sligo, and often "her Majesty's servants from the Theatre Royal, Crow Street ... visited Sligo, even during the Dublin season, showing that in those days the townsfolk appreciated the Drama, for in some instances the company remained during several months".

There are now two full-time theatres in the town, including the Blue Raincoat Theatre Company, was founded in 1990 and based in Quay street. Sligo is also home to Hawk's Well Theatre, a 340-seat theatre founded in 1982.

=== In media ===
Sligo is the setting for author Declan Burke's series of hard boiled detective novels, featuring detective Harry Rigby.

Sebastian Barry's novels The Secret Scripture and The Whereabouts of Eneas McNulty are also set in Sligo town.

Sligo is the setting for John Michael McDonagh's 2014 darkly comedic drama film Calvary, in which a priest continues to serve his parishioners despite their increased hostility towards him and the Catholic Church.

Together with Dublin, County Sligo is one of the two main settings for Sally Rooney's 2018 novel, Normal People. A 2020 adaptation made by BBC Three and Hulu was partially filmed in Sligo.

== Sport ==
=== Football ===
The town is home to 2012 League of Ireland Premier Division champions Sligo Rovers, who have played home matches at The Showgrounds since they were founded in 1928.

There are also a number of junior association football (soccer) clubs who play in the Sligo–Leitrim & District league from the town. These include Calry Bohemians, Cartron United, City United & St. John's FC who play in the Super League and Glenview Stars, MCR FC, Merville United & Swagman Wanderers who play in the Premier League.

=== Gaelic games ===
There are three GAA clubs located in and around the town, including Calry/St. Joseph's of Hazelwood, St John's of Cuilbeg and St Mary's of Ballydoogan with Coolera/Strandhill of Ransboro and Drumcliffe/Rosses Point GAA also being close by. Calry/St Joseph's and St Mary's compete in the Sligo Senior Football Championship while St John's compete in the Sligo Intermediate Football Championship. Calry/St Joseph's also compete in the Sligo Senior Hurling Championship. These clubs also field Junior, Ladies, Minor and Underage teams. Many of the major Gaelic football and hurling matches, such as the inter-county home games of Sligo or a club championship finals, take place at Markievicz Park.

=== Rugby ===
Sligo RFC is situated at Hamilton Park, Strandhill, 8 km west of the town. This club participates in the Ulster Bank All-Ireland League Division 2B.

=== Other sports ===
Sligo (in particular Strandhill) is a location for surfing, and there are several surf schools in the area.

There are two nearby golf courses, County Sligo (Rosses Point) Golf Club and Strandhill Golf Club. Also just north of the borough boundary at Lisnalurg, there is Pitch and Putt called Bertie's. Rosses Point hosted the West of Ireland Championship in which future golfing star Rory McIlroy won in consecutive years (2005 and 2006).

Two basketball clubs are based in the town. These are Sligo All-Stars (located at the Mercy College Gymnasium) and Sligo Giant Warriors (whose venue is the Sligo Grammar Gymnasium).

Sligo Racecourse at Cleveragh hosts race days at least 8 times per year.

== Administration ==
Sligo was administered by its own local oireachtas and the kings of Cáirbre Drom Cliab until the English conquest in the early 17th century. This territory corresponds closely to the newly created Sligo Borough District.

Sligo town then became an incorporated municipal borough with a Royal charter issued by the British King James I between 1613 and 1614. Sligo has had a mayor since incorporation in 1613. It had the right to elect 12 burgesses to the corporation. It was one of ten boroughs retained under the Municipal Corporations (Ireland) Act 1840. Under the Local Government (Ireland) Act 1898, the area became an urban district, while retaining the style of a borough corporation.

Sligo Borough Corporation became a borough council in 2002. On 1 June 2014, the borough council was dissolved and administration of the town was amalgamated with the Sligo County Council. It retains the right to be described as a borough. The chair of the borough district uses the title of mayor, rather than Cathaoirleach.

As of the 2019 Sligo County Council election, the borough district of Sligo contains the local electoral area of Sligo–Strandhill, electing 10 seats to the council.

=== Law enforcement ===
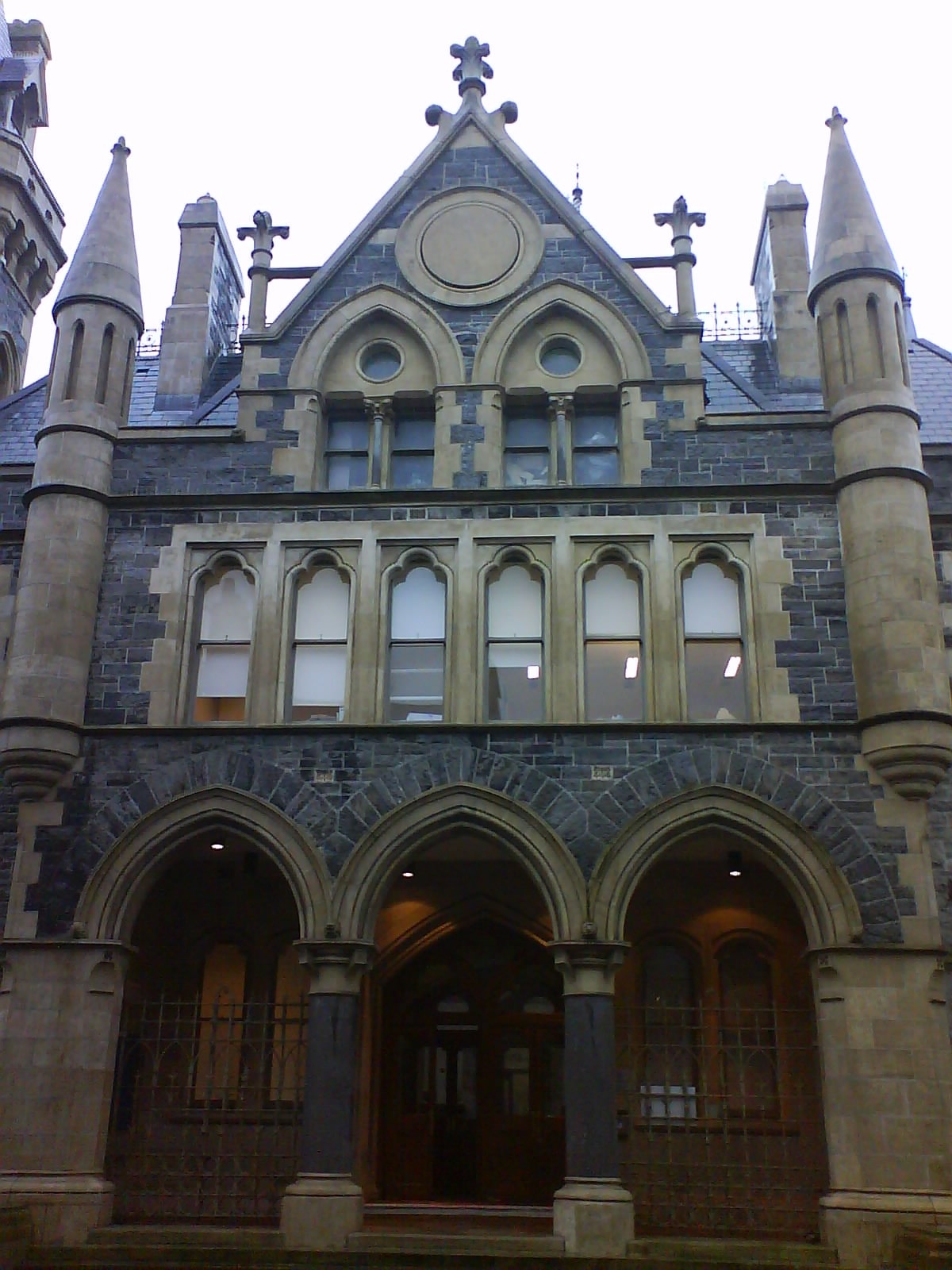
Sligo courthouse

From its foundation in the 13th century, Sligo was administered under local Fénechus (Brehon law) until the establishment of English Common law in the early 17th century after the battle of Kinsale. Courts were held regularly throughout the tuath at various buildings and on hilltops reserved for the purpose. Law enforcement was a function of the nobility and freemen of the area as no police force existed. No records survive from these early courts, but a case is recorded of a Dublin merchant being reimbursed by the local courts after he was fraudulently sold an out of date poem in the 1540s. Sligo then came under English martial law and eventually the common law as administered from Dublin and from which descends the present system.

The modern Sligo Courthouse was built in 1878. It hosts regular District and Circuit Court sittings throughout the year, and occasionally the High Court.

Sligo-Leitrim divisional headquarters of the Garda Síochána is on Pearse Road in the town on the site of the old RIC barracks.

=== Health services ===
Sligo provides hospital services to much of the North Western region. The two main hospitals are Sligo University Hospital (formerly General and Regional) and St. John's Community Hospital. There is also a private hospital at Garden Hill.

== Education ==
As of 2016, 14.2 per cent of adults were educated to at most primary level only; a further 45.1 per cent attained second level while 40.7 per cent were educated to third level.

There are five secondary schools in Sligo. These are two all-girls schools (Mercy College and Ursuline College) and three mixed (Summerhill College, Sligo Grammar School and Ballinode Community College).

Sligo has a campus of Atlantic Technological University (ATU) located in Ash Lane. The university was formed in 2022 through the merger of: the Institute of Technology, Sligo (ITS); Galway-Mayo Institute of Technology (GMIT) and Letterkenny Institute of Technology (LYIT). It offers courses in the disciplines of business, engineering, humanities and science.

St. Angela's College (outside the town proper) is a campus of the Atlantic Technological University, and offers courses in nursing and health studies, home economics and education.

== Transportation ==
=== Road ===
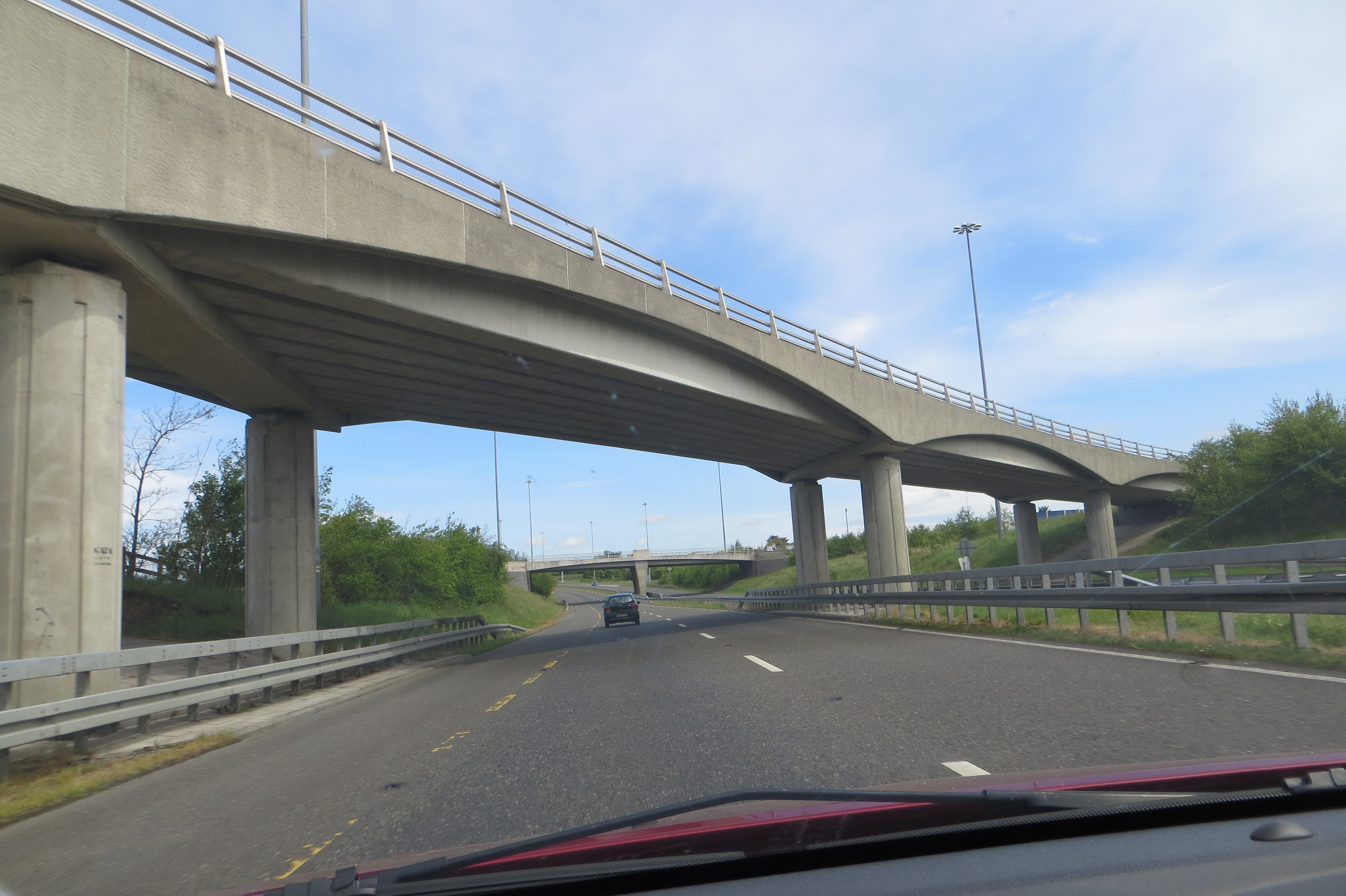
The N4 road near Sligo

The main roads to Sligo are the N4 to Dublin, the N17 to Galway, the N15 to Lifford, County Donegal; and the N16 to Blacklion, County Cavan. The section of the N4 road between Sligo and Collooney is a dual carriageway. The first phase of this road was completed in January 1998, bypassing the towns of Collooney and Ballysadare. An extension to this road was completed in September 2005, and is known as the Sligo Inner Relief Road.

O'Connell Street – the main street in the town – was pedestrianised on 15 August 2006. Plans for the proposed redevelopment and paving of this street were publicly unveiled on 23 July 2008 in The Sligo Champion. The newspaper later revealed that people were not in favour of the pedestrianisation of the street. The street was reopened to traffic in December 2009.

Sligo has a certain amount of cycleways in proximity to the town and various road traffic calming measures have been installed helping to improve safety for pedestrians and cyclists. The Urban Cycle Sligo initiative, for example, created six cycle routes.

=== Rail ===
Map of the west of Ireland. Proposed Western Rail Corridor indicated between Collooney and Athenry. Ex-GSWR line south of Limerick in green, other ex-MGWR lines are in red.

Sligo acquired a rail link to Dublin on 3 December 1862, with the opening of Sligo railway station. Connections to Enniskillen and the north followed in 1881 and Limerick and the south in 1895. The line to Enniskillen closed in 1957 and passenger services to Galway-Ennis-Limerick closed in 1963. For many years Córas Iompair Éireann (CIÉ) kept the latter line open for freight traffic, before its full closure. The proposed Western Rail Corridor redevelopment project seeks to reopen it. In 1966 Sligo railway station was renamed Sligo Mac Diarmada Station after Irish rebel Seán Mac Diarmada from County Leitrim. Irish Rail, the Republic of Ireland's state railway operator, runs inter-city rail services on the Dublin-Sligo railway line. As of January 2026, there are up to eight trains daily each way between Sligo and Dublin Connolly, with a frequency of approximately every two hours.

=== Air ===
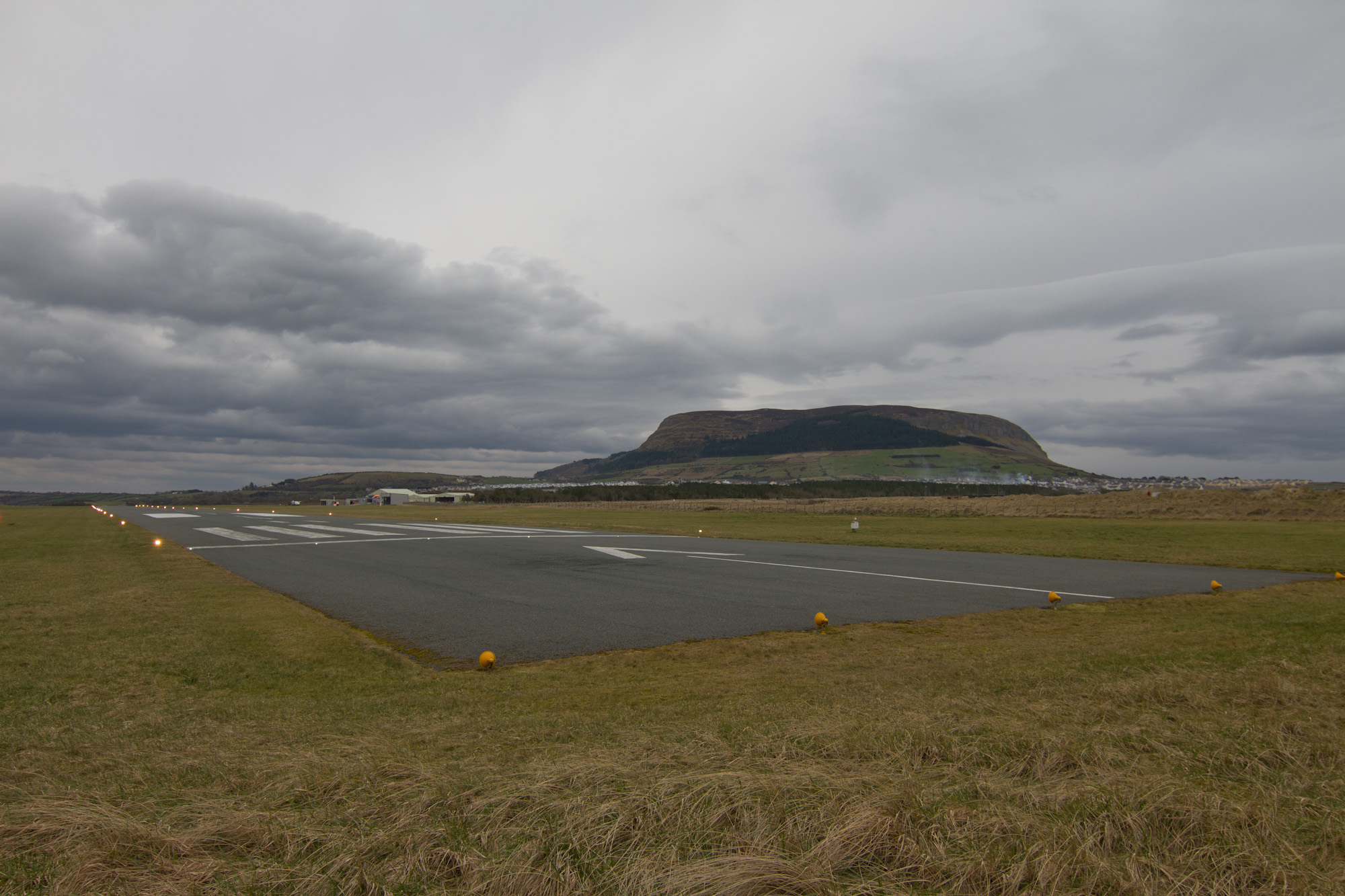
The runway at Sligo Airport, with Knocknarea in the rear-ground

Sligo and County Sligo are served by Sligo Airport, 8 km (5.0 mi) from Sligo town and near Strandhill, though no scheduled flights operate out of the airport. The nearest airport with scheduled flights is Ireland West Airport near to Charlestown, County Mayo, 55 km (34 mi) away.

The Irish Coast Guard Helicopter Search & Rescue has been based at Sligo Airport since 2004, callsign Rescue 118. Bristow Ireland provide 24 hour search and rescue using a Leonardo AW189.

The helicopter is operated by a crew of four, maintained and supported year round. The most northerly base in Ireland, it deals with the stern challenges posed by the Atlantic Ocean and the clifftop environment along the north-west coast.

As of April 2026, plans for a new air ambulance helicopter operated by the National Ambulance Service were reportedly being finalised. The new service is proposed to operate alongside the Coast Guard operation and provide rapid response to inland incidents and transfers between hospitals.

=== Bus ===
Bus Éireann operates four bus routes in the town: one serves the town centre and another the west of the town. The other two routes run from the town to Strandhill and Rosses Point respectively. Bus Éireann also provides inter-city services to: Enniskillen, via Manorhamilton; to Derry; to Galway, via Ireland West Airport; and to Dublin, via Dublin Airport and towns along the N4 road.

Bus Feda operates a route from Gweedore, County Donegal, via Sligo to Galway.

=== Sligo Port ===
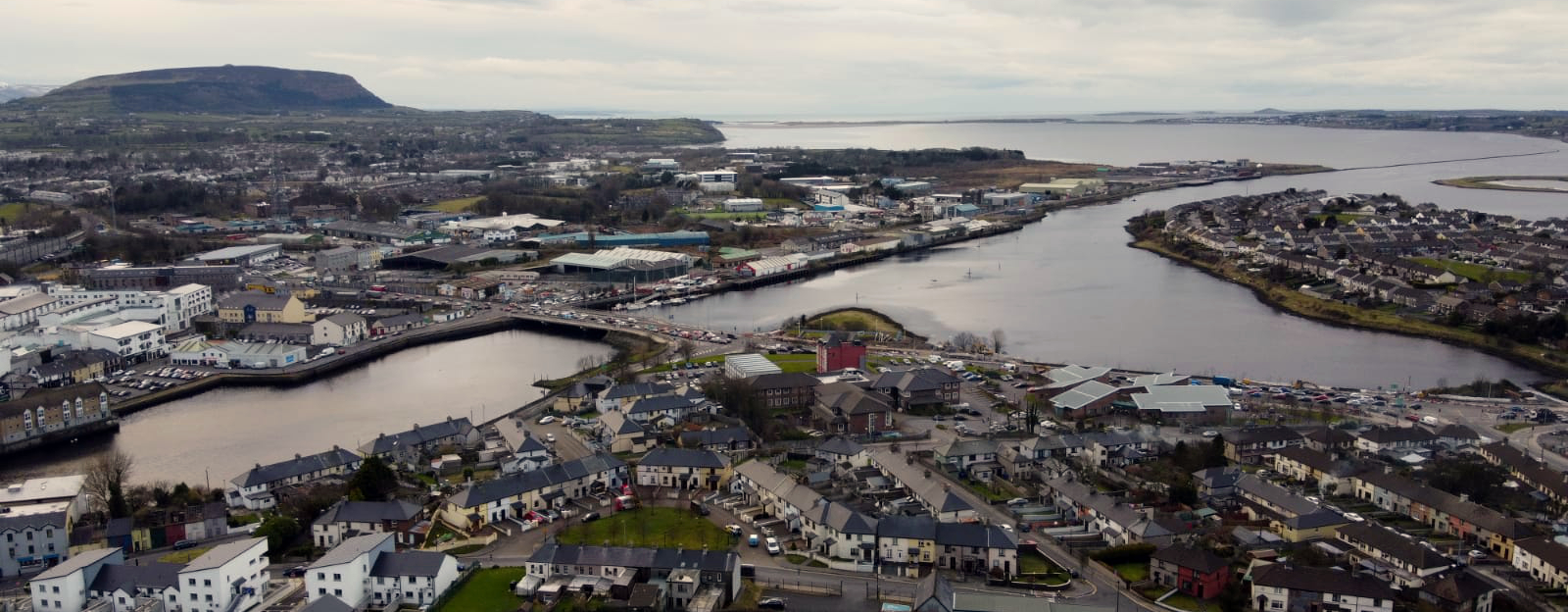
Picture of Sligo Harbour looking west to Sligo Bay, with Knocknarea mountain visible to the left

Sligo is the only working cargo port on Ireland's northwest coast between Galway and Derry. The harbour can accommodate ships with a maximum draft of 4.5m, a maximum length of 100m and a maximum deadweight of 3000 metric tons. There are currently two berths at the port, Deepwater Quay with a length of 75m and Barytes Quay with a length of 55m. There is also a pontoon called Timber Jetty much closer to the town centre with mooring for small pleasure craft. Sligo's quays extend for a distance of approximately 1.6 kilometres (1 mi).

The Harbour Commissioners of Sligo administered the port from 1877 until Sligo County Council took over responsibility for the Harbour from Sligo Harbour Commissioners in June 2006.

Records show the development of Sligo's port, exporting agricultural goods to Britain and Europe, in the 13th century with the arrival of the Normans. In 1420 port dues were levied for the first time. Later, as a port under Gaelic lords the harbour continued to flourish. Control of the taxes or "cocket" of Sligo port became a sought after prize of local dynasties. Native merchant families, like the O'Creans wine importers being the most well known. Sligo traded with France, Spain and Portugal throughout the Middle Ages.

Sligo was an important port within the Kingdom of Ireland. During the 17th and 18th centuries, the port was used for the transit of linen, cattle, hides, butter, barley, oats and oatmeal. Imports included wood, iron, maize and coal. The town prospered due to the trade, with wealthy merchants setting up homes along the then fashionable Castle Street and Radcliffe Street (later renamed Grattan Street). Linen was a major export also through Sligo Port, with Pernmill Road memorialising the linen textile mills.

When I was a child at Sligo I could see above my grandfather's trees a little column of smoke from "the pern mill," and was told that "pern" was another name for the spool, as I was accustomed to call it, on which thread was wound.

— W B Yeats

During the time of the Great Famine (1847–1850), it is estimated that more than 30,000 people emigrated through Sligo Port, mainly to Canada and the United States.

The shipping companies which operated from Sligo included the Sligo Steam Navigation Company, which introduced the first steamer in 1857, Messrs Middleton & Pollexfen, Harper Cambell Ltd and the former Sligo Harbour Commissioners, which operated a number of dredgers used for the maintenance of the channel.

The Sligo docks played an important role in the history of the labour movement in Ireland. The 1913 Sligo Dock strike lasted for 56 days and was a precursor to the Dublin Lockout that occurred 6 months later. Unlike the Dublin Lockout, the Sligo Dock strike resulted in victory to the workers.

The Port of Sligo declined during the 20th century with the decline of sail and steamships and the increasing size of cargo vessels. As of the 21st century, the port handles cargoes of coal, timber, fish meal and scrap metal and around 25 ships per year dock in the harbour.

== Media ==
There are three local newspapers in Sligo: The Sligo Weekender (published every Thursday), the free Northwest Express (published the first Thursday of each month), and The Sligo Champion (published every Tuesday). Sligo Now is a monthly entertainment guide for the town, while Sligo Sport is a monthly sports-specific newspaper.

The town has two local/regional radio stations: Ocean FM, which broadcasts throughout County Sligo and parts of some bordering counties; and West youth radio station i102-104FM, which merged with its sister station i105-107FM in 2011 to create iRadio.

== Twinning ==
Sligo is twinned with the following places:

- Everett, Washington, United States
- Crozon, Brittany, France
- Illapel, Choapa Province, Chile
- Kempten, Bavaria, Germany
- Tallahassee, Florida, United States

== Gallery ==
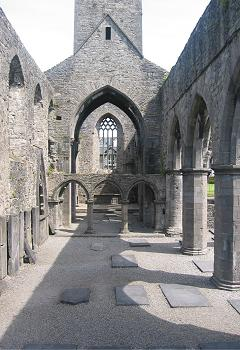
Choir of Sligo Abbey

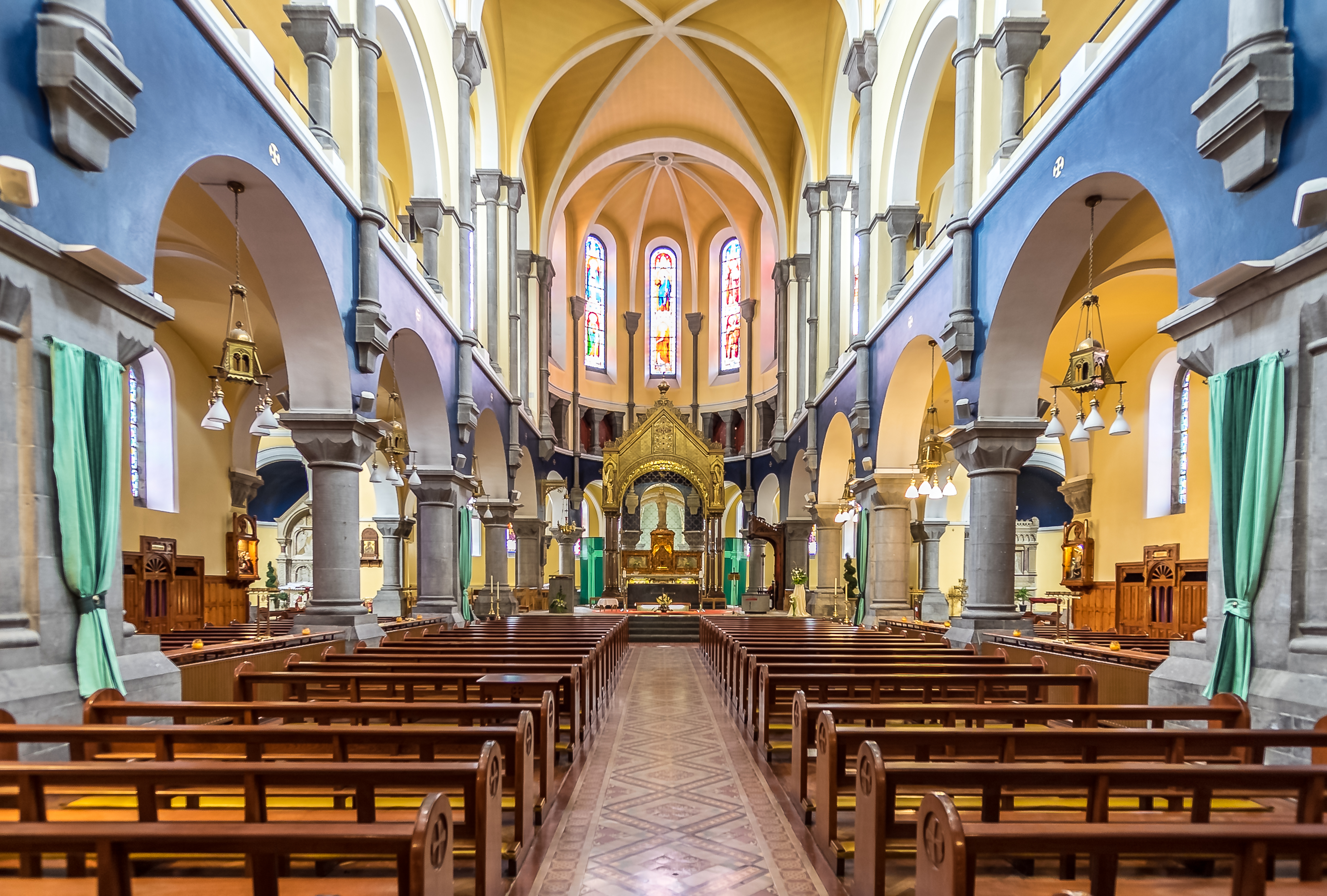
Interior of the Cathedral of the Immaculate Conception

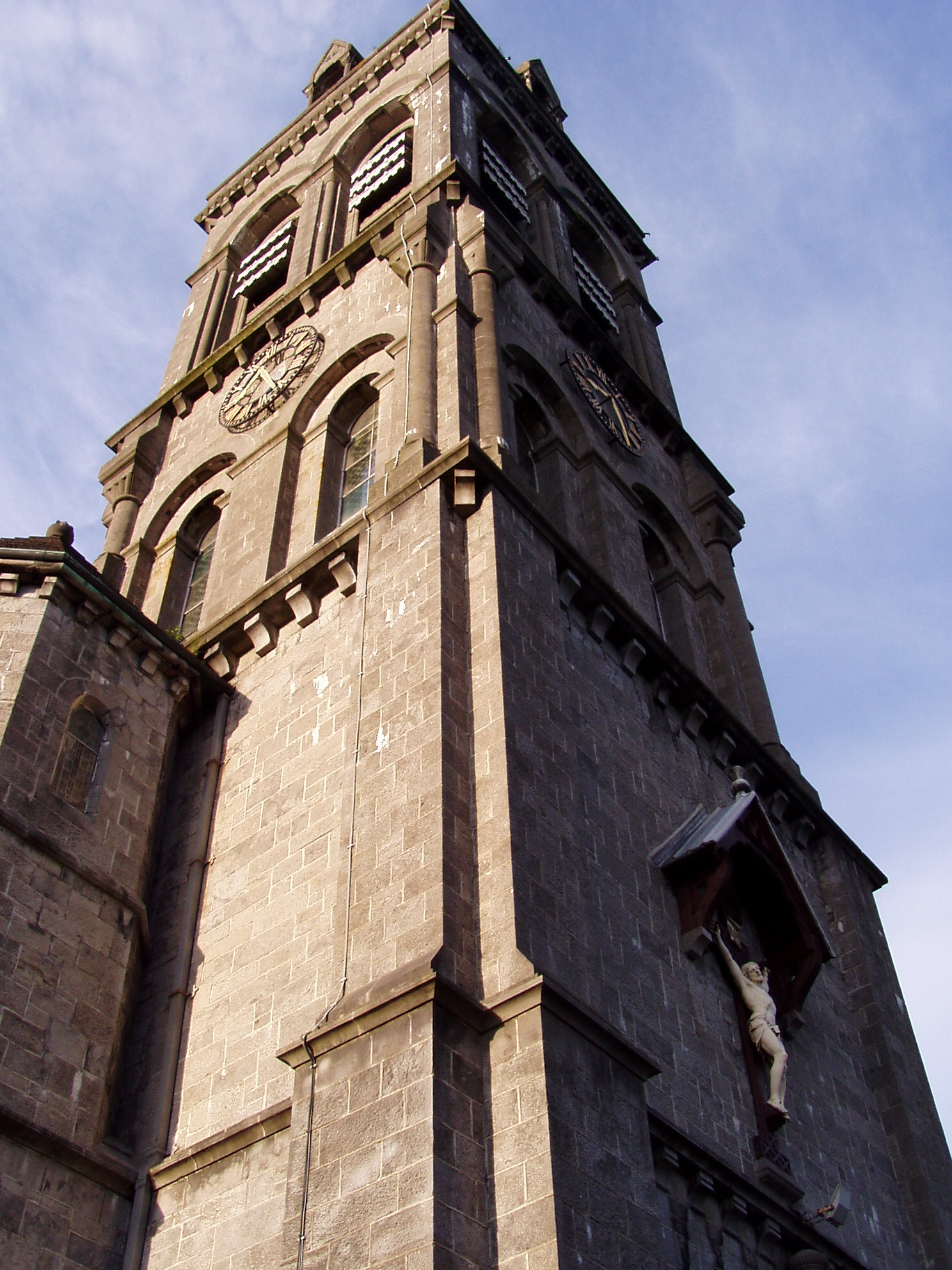
Clock tower of the cathedral

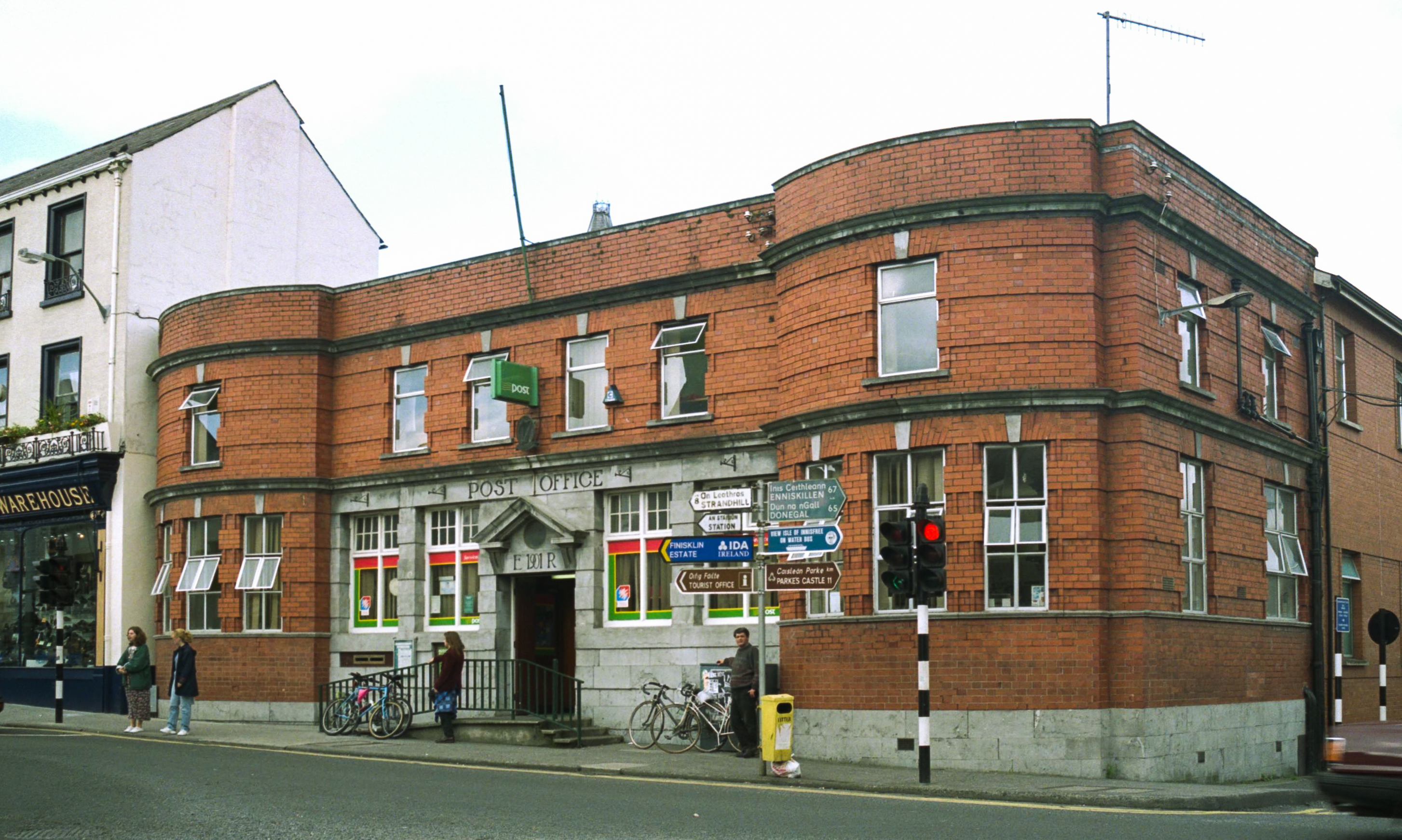
Sligo Post Office in 1996

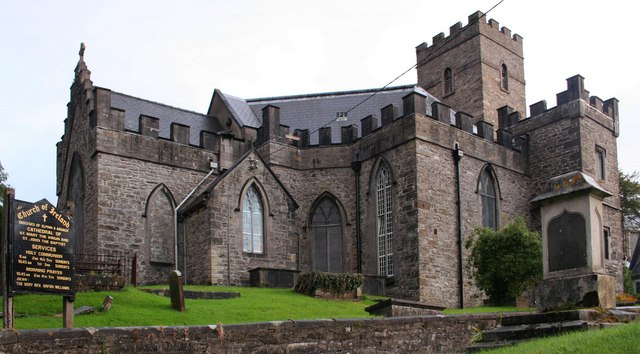
St John the Baptist Cathedral, Church of Ireland

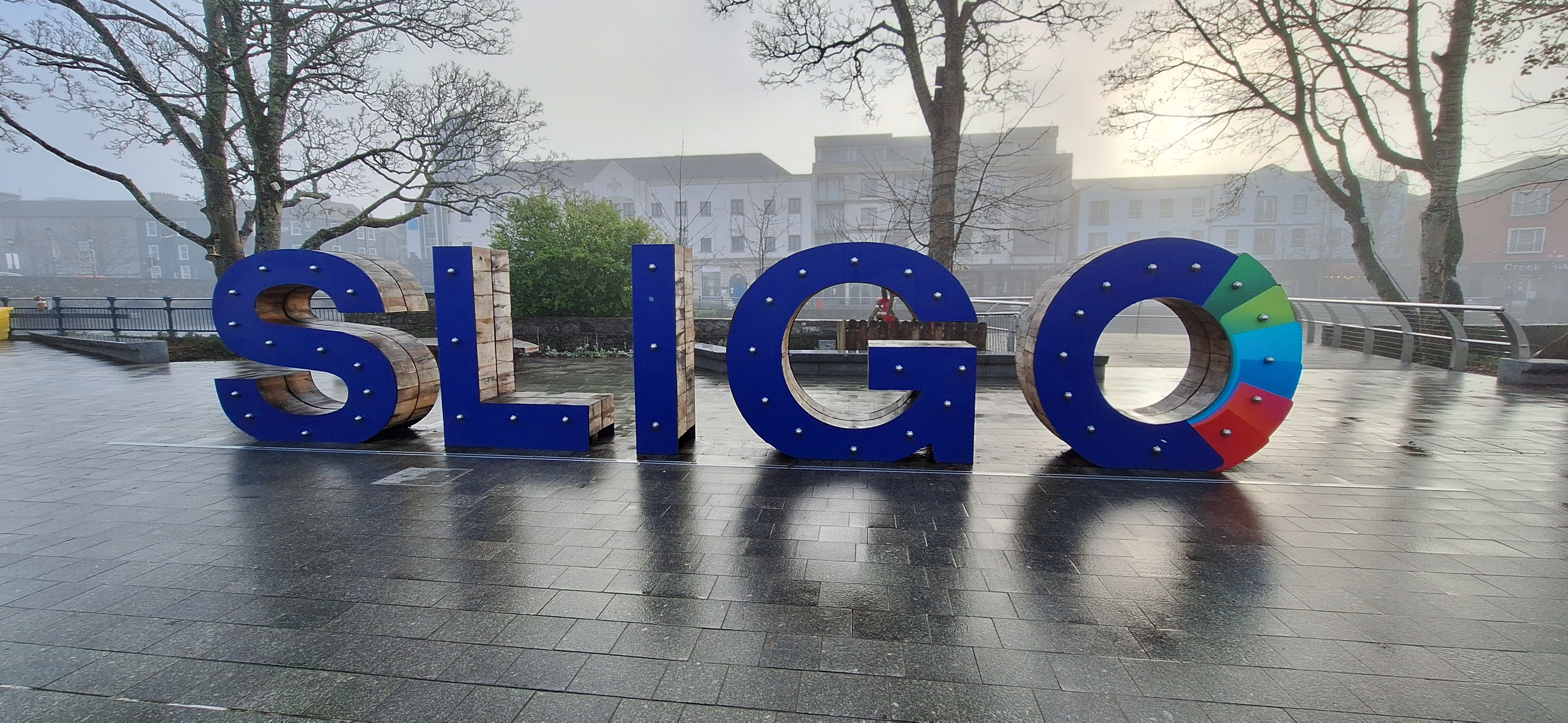
Queen Maeve Square

== See also ==
- List of towns and villages in Ireland
