= Drumcliff Monastery =

Ruined monastery in County Sligo, Ireland

- Mainistir Dhroim Chliabh (Irish)
- Interactive map of Drumcliff Monastery
- 54.326°N 8.494°W
- Nearest city: Sligo

History
- Founded: 575 AD
- Founder: Saint Colmcille
- Built: 6th century AD
- Original use: Monastery
- Demolished: 17th Century

Site notes
- Architectural style: Irish Early Christian
- Current use: Religious site and graveyard
- Visitors: (in 180,000)

Drumcliff Monastery (Irish: Mainistir Dhroim Chliabh) was located in Cairbre Drom Cliabh, now County Sligo, five miles north of the modern town of Sligo. The site consists of the remains of a round tower and several high crosses, including one outstanding example. It is currently also the site of a Church of Ireland parish church and a graveyard. It is the burial place of the poet William Butler Yeats. Founded in the 6th century by Saint Colmcille, he is said to have declared in a later literary fragment:

Beloved to my heart also in the West— Drumcliffe at Culcinne's strand.

== Location ==
Drumcliff was founded as a monastery in 574 AD, at the base of Benbulben by Saint Colmcille in the territory of Cairbre Drom Cliabh, an area ruled by the Cinel Cairbre descendants of Cairbre Mac Neill son of Niall of the Nine Hostages the founder of the Ui Neill dynasty. The site was probably donated by the northern Ui Neill High king and relative of Colmcille, Aed Ainmire.

The monastery was located on the south bank of the river Codhnach, now the Drumcliff river that runs from Glencar lake to the sea at Drumcliff bay. The monastery was on land near the site of the Battle Of The Book that took place about the year 560, 15 years before the monasteries foundation. Colmcille had taken part in this battle.

The termonn lands attached to the monastery were at the modern townland of Ardtermon (meaning "High Sanctuary") several miles to the west.

== History ==
The early church in Ireland may have been organised in imitation of the Diocesan model, which was an urban model with metropolitan Bishops having power. This quickly gave way to a monastic system organised in a more decentralised manner more suited to the Irish system of political organisation. Clans and their territories, known as tuatha, were organised into confederations, and the Irish monasteries began to conform to this pattern, with the founder of a monastery becoming, in a similar way to the founder of a dynasty, the head of, in Latin, a familia or paruchia, a group of confederated monasteries.

Drumcliff was an early member of the "paruchia Columbae", the confederation of monasteries that was headquartered at Iona. The Cenél Conaill dynasty, to which Colmcille himself belonged, was the chief patron and ally of the confederation from its founding until the eighth century.

The Columban paruchia in Ireland flourished during the eighth century AD under the aegis of the Southern Uí Néill branch of the Clann Cholmáin. This power was both ecclesiastical and political through alliances with secular rulers.

Thereafter in the ninth century it was eclipsed in power by the Patrician paruchia based at Armagh. The reign of the Cenél nEogain overking Áed Oirdnide, was detrimental to Columban fortunes, as this king was openly hostile towards the Columban community Armagh, the head of the Patrician paruchia, saw itself as the ‘Rome of the Irish’, and sought to extend its power using its associations with Patrick, and therefore Rome, and also to take advantage of the fact that the Columban federation had been mired in controversy during the debates over Easter.

Increasing Viking attacks also took their toll, leading in 804 to the relocation of the head of the Columban monasteries from Iona to Kells.

The Columban federation enjoyed close relations with the Ceile De and Drumcliff may have had a community of this group.

A Saint Thorian or Mothorian was appointed the first abbot or comharba (successor) of St Columba. A later abbot, Saint Torannon who died in 921 AD, was regarded as the patron of the area.

He believed the top of Ben Bulben was the closest to heaven in Ireland.

The Erenagh of Drumcliff were O' Beollain (Boland) and O'Coineil.

=== Cill Muadhnat ===
To the east of the monastery in the townland of Ballynagalliagh (Baile na Caillech), or in the townland of Keelty, the location remains uncertain, was a church dedicated to Saint Muadhnat. She is said to be one of the three "daughters of Nadfraech" and sister of Saint Molaise of Devenish. The other two sisters are Saint Osnat and Saint Tallulah (Tuilelaith) of Kildare.

"Muadhnat, Virgin. Caille is the name of her abode in Carbery of Druim-Cliabh.

Tallula, Abbess of Cill-dara.

Osnat, Virgin. These three were the three sisters of Molaise of Daimhinis."

— The Martyrology of Donegal

The 12th-century text the Colloquy of the Sages mentions while describing a journey of the Fenian warriors through the district that they travelled "to Cailli in Chosnuma, called Cill Muadnatan."

Saint Osnats church exists in the valley of Glencar, formerly Geann Dallain, nearby.

Around 1223 the church lands at Ballynagalliagh became attached to the Arroasian Augustinian convent at Kilcreevanty near Tuam. This order was known for providing service to travellers.

=== Annal entries ===
- 574/5 Mothorianus first abbot.
- 871 Dunadhach, son of Raghallach, Lord of Cinel Cairbre-Mor, Protector of the roaring shore, pious warrior of the sons of Conn, was interred under hazel crosses in Drumcliff. AFM
- 921 AD the Abbot Maolpatrick, son of Moran died. AFM
- 930 AD Abbot Maenghal Mac Becan dies.
- 950 AD the erenagh Flann ua Becan died.
- 1029 the erenagh Angus O Hennesy was burned to death. AFM
- 1053 the erenagh Morrough O Beollain died. AFM
- 1252 Maelmoedoc O Beollain, coarb of Colum Cille at Drumcliff, the richest and most prosperous man of his time in Ireland and the most esteemed, most charitable and most generous, died after a victory of honour(?) and penitence.
- 1254 the Comharba Maelfinnan O'Beollain died.
- 1315 The daughter of Manus O Conor, wife of O Donnell attacked the churches in Drumcliff, where several of the clerics and comarbs were plundered by her.
- 1362 O Beollain comharba of Drumcliff, died.
- 1416 Muirgius O Coineoil, coarb of Drumcliff, was burned in his own house by robbers.
- 1503 O Beollain, comharba of St. Colmcille at Drumcliff, died.

== Dissolution and confiscation ==
The old monastery was already in decline through the later Middle Ages as it was gradually eclipsed by the new continental abbeys like the Dominican Friary at Sligo. From the 13th century Sligo abbey became the preferred burial place for the local Gaelic dynasty of O Conchobar Sligigh. The last monks are mentioned as present in 1503, although when it was finally abandoned is unknown.

In 1537 Henry introduced legislation in the Irish parliament to dissolve the Irish houses. This could not be acted on until the Tudor conquest had been extended to Connacht during the last decade of the 16th century. Lands belonging to the monastery were transferred to the new church of Ireland Diocese of Elphin.

An inquisition of the 17th century states that there stood at Drumcliff "a certain vaulted stone house known as Teach O Connell" and also "a church and a house belonging to the parson of Drumcliff at the west end of the church.

== Present site ==
Samuel Lewis in 1837 mentions that some remains of monastic buildings were then still visible.

A round tower survives at the western end of the site.

An early Christian cross slab was found in the graveyard.

There are four high crosses known so far from Drumcliff. The sandstone shaft of a cross stands near the entrance, it has a mortise for a cross piece that is now missing. Sections of another cross are built into the interior wall of the church, these were discovered during repairs in 1999. Decorative patterns are visible on this cross.

Three sections of a cross are also held by the national museum. The west face has the mocking of Christ and the Resurrection, the east, Daniel in the Lions den and the sacrifice of Isaac.

=== High cross ===
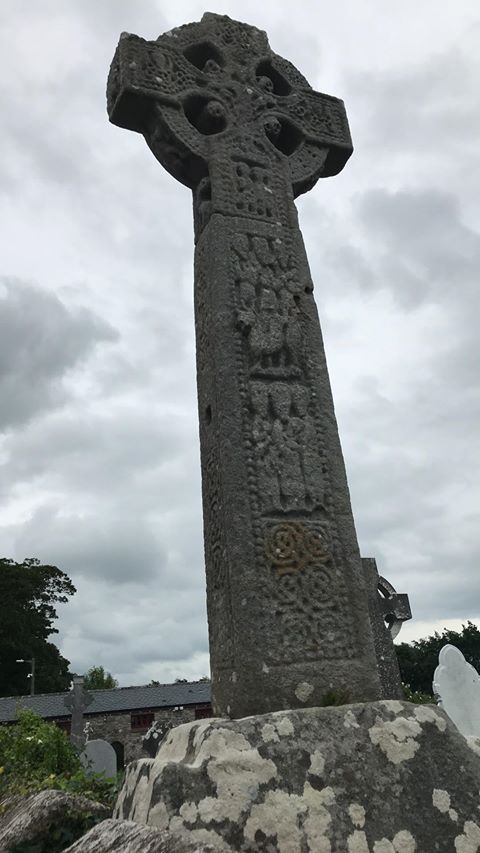
West face of the high cross

The main high cross is the only example of its kind surviving in County Sligo. It is carved in the Urnes style. It has been dated tentatively on artistic grounds to the 9th or 10th century. It measures 3 metres (10 feet) high x 1.1m arms span, the shaft is 47 cm wide by 31 cm. The cross has beaded moulding surrounding scriptural panels. Mythical beasts are represented in high relief on the sides of the cross. The west face shows scenes from the New Testament, the east face shows scenes from the Old Testament. There is considerable debate about interpretation of these scenes, many of which remain uncertain.

The cross has the only known representation of the Virgin Mary and child on any cross in Ireland, on the south face of the cross arm.

The cross gives prominence to the infancy cycle of John the Baptist, a story known from the apocraphyl Protoevangelion of James, attributed to James the brother of Jesus. John the Baptist was a particular focus of the Columban monastic tradition.

The west face consists of

- 3 figures facing to the front, the central figure holds a child diagonally across her body. Harbison argues that the scene represents the presentation of John the Baptist in the Temple.
- High relief of a camel walking across the shaft.
- Arrest/Mocking of Jesus. Jesus is the central figure, flanked by two soldiers.
- Return from Egypt / Zachariah, Elisabeth and John the Baptist.
- Crucifixion, Jesus is depicted centrally with long robes to the knee – Stephaton offers vinegar and Longinus lifts his spear.
- Arms, heads that may represent the thieves in the crucifixion.

The east face consists of

- An interlace pattern composed of four circles. Stokes suggests the base of the Tree of Life.
- Adam and Eve, Eve eating the apple in the Garden of Eden. Genesis 3
- High Relief of an animal, arguably a lion due to its mane, walking across the shaft.
- David kills Goliath. 1 Samuel 17.49.
- Daniel in the Lion's Den. Daniel 6:16.

This panel is uncertain. Suggestions include the Second Coming of Christ, The Last Judgement, Maiestas Domini. Top and ring, interlace, animal heads (presumed) spirals.

The cross arm of the south side depicts Mary with the Child Jesus, held in front of her.

=== Round tower ===
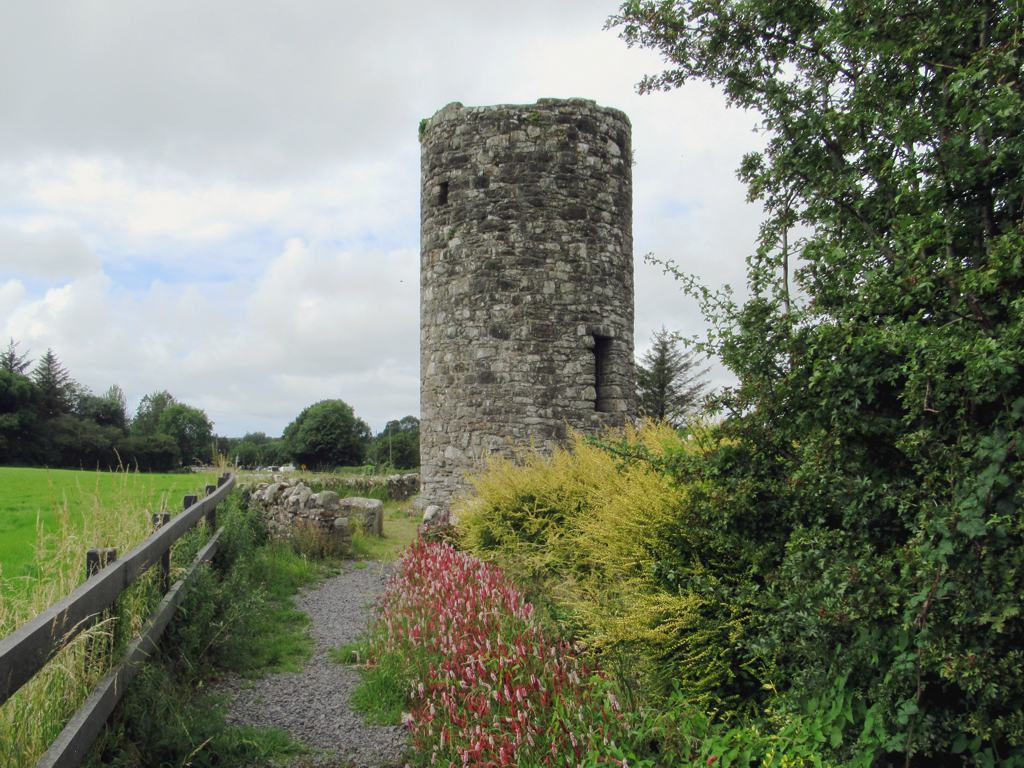
Remains of round tower

The diameter of the round tower is just under 5 meters. It rises about 9 meters from ground level. The ESE-facing doorway is 1.75 meters above ground level. Lightning is reported have struck the tower in 1396.

== Archaeology ==
Archaeological excavations were carried out in 1982, 1983 and 1984. The excavations revealed evidence for metal manufacturing on site. Bronze and iron waste were found along with pins, bronze needles and buckles, glass and paste beads and iron knives. So called "Crannog ware" pottery showing activity from the 13th century onwards. Bone and antler were used also, particularly for combs. Extensive evidence for agriculture was also found, including, animal bones, shellfish, seeds and grain. A fragment of gold leaf was recovered.

Remote sensing surveys carried out have identified multiple features, including the remains of mill-races.
