= 1832 Sligo cholera outbreak =

Disease outbreak in Sligo, Ireland

The 1832 Sligo cholera outbreak was a severe outbreak of cholera in the port town of Sligo in northwestern Ireland.

The outbreak resulted in an official total of 643 deaths, out of a population of 15,000. However, the official figures are considerably lower, as only Fever Hospital deaths were recorded.

== Background ==
The outbreak was part of a second worldwide pandemic caused by the bacterium Vibrio cholerae and lasted from 1829 to 1851. The approach of the cholera epidemic was well documented at the time, but how it was spread was a mystery. In the first pandemic, the disease was first noted in India, Moscow, Russia in 1830, Finland and Poland in 1831, and Great Britain in 1831. It struck first at the ports, and Sligo was the second busiest port on the west coast at the time after Limerick. Overall, the outbreak killed at least 50,000 people in Ireland.

Cholera killed those infected within hours, usually less than three, and almost certainly less than twelve. Victims' skin often showed a bluish tinge, and diarrhoea led to rapid severe dehydration and death.

== Outbreak ==
The only surviving medical report is by a Dr. Irwin, then attached to the Fever Hospital. The first case of Cholera Asiatica (as it was known then) was noted at Rathcarrick, three miles from the town by a Dr. Coyne on Sunday 29 July. More cases then appeared at Culleenamore, suspected to have been spread by bathers. Dr. Coyne later died of the disease himself.

The Board of Health had the houses of the poor whitewashed and cleaned inside and out. Tar barrels were left burning in the streets in an effort to fumigate the air. Attempts to set up extra medical facilities in the town were resisted by the townspeople, as nobody wanted the infected to be anywhere near them. People armed with clubs and sticks resisted doctors and hospitals being among them. In many cases, doctors themselves were blamed for the outbreak.

The outbreak began in Sligo town on 11 August 1832, with the first official figures for Sligo town being released by Dublin Castle on 18 August. These recorded 63 new cases, 22 deaths and no recoveries. From then until the end of the month the death toll averaged fifty a day. The Fever Hospital was used for the sick, but most of the orderlies fled through fear of the plague or the mob. Mr. Fausset, the Provost of the town, described the grounds of the Fever Hospital covered in corpses and no-one to bury them. He said he felt as if the "end of the world had come".

Carpenters were unable to keep up with the demand for coffins and so mass graves were dug instead. and local legend suggests that people were buried alive, so great was the haste to dispose of the corpses.

An unofficial quarantine cordon was set up around the town through which no one was allowed to pass, but they were driven back to the town.

Efforts to understand the source of the infection included the flying of kites to see if it had an atmospheric origin. Wells were tested.

At the height of the outbreak the population was reported by the Evening Post to have dropped from 15,000 to 2,000, most having fled to the countryside.

== Aftermath ==
The official number of cases was recorded as 1,230, with 643 deaths, although the real toll is suspected to have been considerably higher as many did not report being ill and there was a widespread reluctance to go to a hospital. It was thought that the actual death toll was more than 1,500 people. The population of the town dropped from 15,000 to 12,000.

=== Charlotte Blake Thornley's account ===
Charlotte Blake Thornley, the mother of Bram Stoker was a witness to the cholera outbreak as the family were living on Old Market Street in the town at the time. They survived by fleeing to Ballyshannon having to break the cordon to do so. She wrote a vivid account of the beginning and aftermath of the outbreak.

But gradually the terror grew on us as time by time we heard of it nearer and nearer. It was in France, it was in Germany, it was in England, and (with wild affright) we began to hear a whisper pass "it was in Ireland". Then mens’ senses began failing them for fear, and deeds were done (in selfish dread) enough to call down Gods direct vengeance on us. One i vividly remember, a poor traveller was taken ill on the roadside, some miles from the town, and how did those Samaratines tend him? They dug a pit and with long poles pushed him living into it and covered him up alive. But God’s hand is not to be thus stayed and severely like Sodom did our city pay for such crimes.

— Charlotte Blake Thornley (Stoker)

It is believed that her descriptions of the events at the time were influential on themes and atmosphere of her son's most famous book, Dracula.

== Sources ==
- TCD MS 11076/2/3 f2 Stoker, Mrs CMB (Thornley) Experiences of the Cholera in Ireland ?1832
