= Sligo Steam Navigation Company =

- House flag
- Company type: ship owner and ship operator
- Industry: transport
- Founded: 1865
- Defunct: 1936
- Headquarters: Sligo
- Key people: William Pollexfen, William Middleton, Arthur Jackson
- Products: passenger and cargo shipping

Sligo Steam Navigation Company was formed in 1865. It provided weekly sailings between Glasgow and Liverpool. The company was formed out of Messrs. Middleton and Pollexfen a trading partnership based in Sligo. The company was one of the last three independent cross channel Irish shipping companies still operational in the 1930s. In 1936 Coast Lines Ltd bought Sligo Steamship Navigation Company.

== Company history ==
The company offices were based in Wine street in the town.

Vessels operated by the company included the SS Killarney (1857), the SS Glasgow (1867), the SS Sligo(1889), SS Liverpool, SS Sligo (1913), SS Carrickfergus, the SS Sligo (1930) and SS Tartar (1899).

The SS Sligo (1889) was wrecked in Sligo bay during a storm in 1912.

The SS Liverpool, the biggest vessel operated by the company, was built by Messrs John Jones & Sons and was 686 gross tons. She was designed by the naval architect Henry H West. She was designed to sit below the harbour wall level in Sligo.

== Sinking of the SS Liverpool ==
The steamship SS Liverpool was lost off the south coast of the Isle of Man on 16 December 1916, after hitting a mine laid by a German submarine.

As of December 1996 the wreck has been identified by divers from the Isle of Man.
