= Magheraboy causewayed enclosure =

Neolithic causewayed enclosure in Ireland

Magheraboy Causewayed Enclosure
- Location within Ireland
- 54°16′03″N 8°29′32″W
- Type: Enclosure
- Location: Sligo, Ireland

History
- Built: Neolithic

Site notes
- Material: Timber palisade, earth ditches
- Height: Unknown
- Owner: Private
- Public access: No

Magheraboy causewayed enclosure is an early Neolithic enclosure located near Sligo town in northwest Ireland.

Built during the Early Neolithic period "monumental architecture", the Magheraboy enclosure is the oldest known causewayed enclosure in Britain or Ireland. This site is only the second known causewayed enclosure in Ireland. The other is at Donegore and has radiocarbon dates indicated prolonged occupation from 4000 BC to 2700 BC.

The Magheraboy causewayed enclosure was investigated and published in the book Monumental Beginnings by Ed Danaher as part of the Sligo Inner Relief Road SIRR project.

== Location ==
The site is located in the townland of Magheraboy on a gravel and clay ridge. It is to the south of the present-day town of Sligo on a hilltop. A few kilometres to the west is the low plateau on which the Carrowmore Megalithic Cemetery is located.

== Excavation and results ==
Initial testing took place during 2000 and 2001 for the SIRR road project south of Sligo town. An early medieval ringfort was noted at the site and within the road corridor. This was scheduled for excavation. No trace of the enclosure was discovered at this stage but it was later discovered during excavation of the ringfort, prompting the extension of the excavation.

=== Palisade trench ===
Packing stones supported the upright posts which were once set into it and these would have formed a fence believed to have been between 1.5 metres and 2 metres in height. The construction method of the palisade was not the same everywhere.

The palisade was built using upright posts set wide apart with planks laid horizontally between them, while in other sections the upright posts were set firmly against each other edge to edge.

Three metres outside the palisade trench ditch were gaps, or causeways, of undug soil, the feature which gives these sites their name in archaeological typology.

Within the interior of the enclosure between 40 and 50 pits and artefacts dating from the Early Neolithic were found, including flint tools such as blades and scrapers, and pottery, possible hammer-stones, worked chert, quartz and flint. Burnt bone found within the fills of these pits has been identified as animal in origin. Some pits gave radiocarbon dates of between 3600 BC and 3400 BC.

A possible cremation, an unused flint arrowhead, broken sherds of Neolithic pottery and fragments of cremated bone were situated to the south-west of the ditch. Within one ditch segment 28 pieces of worked quartz partially encircled an unused stone axe and a fragment of a javelin/arrowhead.

=== Adjoining structure ===
A number of closely-set postholes straddling the palisade fence on the southern side of the site may represent the remains of a small tower. The structure was defined by the remains of a slot trench abutting the palisade trench on the southern side of the enclosure. Measuring approximately 14 m by 6 m, the structures function remains uncertain.

== Phases and dating ==
Radiocarbon dates from sample material recovered from the outer ditch segments indicate that the enclosure was built between 4100 BC and 3800 BC.

== Significance ==
The location, rarity and age of this structure mark it as of great importance to the history of Ireland and northwestern Europe. As one of only two known causewayed enclosures in Ireland and with very early dates it is central to understanding the introduction of farming and farming cultures to Ireland at the end of the 5th millennium BC.

Its location east of the Carrowmore megalithic cemetery and Miosgán Médhbh on Knocknarea further underscores this importance.
