= Carbury, County Sligo =

Coordinates: 54.2735°N 8.4770°W

Carbury Cairbre Drumcliabh (Irish)
- Barony
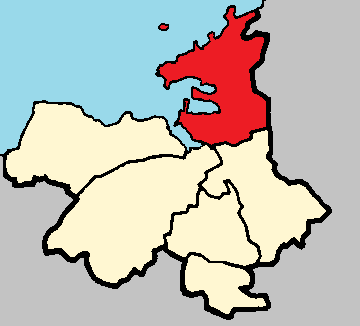
- Country: Ireland
- Province: Connacht
- County: Sligo

Area
  - Land: 298.2 km^{2} (115.1 sq mi)

Population (2016)
  - Total: 33,399
  - Density: 112/km^{2} (290/sq mi)

Carbury (Irish: Cairbre Drumcliabh) is a barony in the north of County Sligo in the west of Ireland. It corresponds to the ancient túath of Cairbre Drom Cliabh.

The barony is in the north of County Sligo, bordering County Leitrim.
