= Cairbre Drom Cliabh =

Túath in Lower Connacht, Ireland

Cairbre Drom Cliabh Cairbre na Catha/Críoch Cairbre/Cairbre Mór
- Túath/ Tríocha Céad
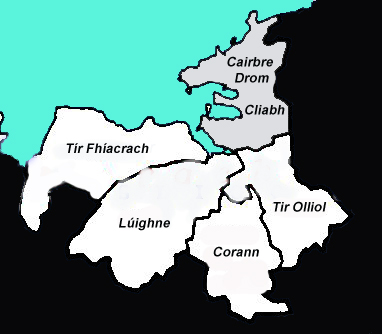
- Cairbre Drom Cliabh in Iochtar Connacht.
- History
  - Created: uncertain
  - Abolished: 1603
  - Succeeded by: Barony of Carbury, County Sligo
- Status: Saor túath (Free Territory)
- Government
  - Type: Rí túath/Oireacht Mixed Democratic Monarchy
- Contained within
  - Confederation: Iochtar Connacht
- Subdivisions
  - Type: Parishes/Townlands

Cairbre Drom Cliabh (meaning "Ui Cairbre, the descendants of Cairbre of Drumcliff) was an Irish túath in the ancient confederation of Íochtar Connacht (Lower Connacht), now County Sligo in the west of Ireland. It is now represented by the barony of Carbury. Also known as Cairbre na Catha (Carbury of the Battles). It existed from at least the 6th century to the 16th century AD.

As a frontier territory of Connacht it was a saor-túath (territory exempt from tribute) under several Irish dynasties over time, but mostly under a branch of the O'Connor dynasty called the Clann Aindrias or O'Connor Sligo The O Conor Sligo (Ó Conchobhair Sligigh) were a branch of the Ó Conchobhair royal family who were Kings of Connacht. They were descended from Brian Luighnech Ua Conchobhair (k.1181) and were Lords of Sligo into the middle of the 17th century.

For a list of chiefs of Cairbre Drom Cliabh see O'Conchobar Sligigh.

== Location and extent ==
This territory is between the coast and the Dartry Mountains, borders Ulster to the north and extends from the Owenmore river at Ballysadare to the Drowes (Drobhaois) River near Bundoran. It included the districts of Cálraighe Locha Gile, Magh Cetne, Bréachmhaigh, Magh Eabha, Cúil Iorra and part of Dartraige. Benbulben (Benn Ghulbain) is in it along with Knocknarea and Lough Gill. The extent was larger prior to the twelfth century.

== Organisation ==
The territory was governed by an elected Rí-tuath and an oireachtas or assembly of free noblemen under the Gaelic system of Fenechus law. It was organised into parishes from the 12th century and townlands.

== History ==
The túath takes its name from the semi-legendary king Cairbre mac Néill, third son of Niall of the Nine Hostages. Cairbre is described as an enemy of Saint Patrick. Tírechán's seventh century Life of Patrick states that Cairbre was cursed by the saint, at the hill of Tara, that none of his descendants would be High King. He is most closely associated with Tailtu and Granard in the early accounts.

Cairbre was excluded from most later lists of High Kings but remains in the earliest, the Baile Chuinn Chétchathaig. Chiefs of Cenél Cairpre included O'Mulclohy (the Irish: Ó Maolchloiche) a name later translated to Stone. Cairbre's descendants at an early date controlled a larger Cairpre Mor grouping which stretched from Sligo to Westmeath, taking in Leitrim and parts of Fermanagh (such as Tuatha Ratha or Magheraboy) and Longford (North Tethbae). It was split in two by the expansion of the Kingdom of Breifne under the Uí Briúin. The southern group known as the Cairpre Gabra settled in the barony of Granard in County Longford. Another branch known as the "Uí Cairpri Laigen" which settled in barony of Carbury in County Kildare was probably a later off-shoot of this group. Cairbre supplied only one High King of Ireland, his grandson, Túathal Máelgarb Dunadhach.

In 561 AD the Battle of Cúl Dreimhne (also called the Battle of the Book) was fought at Cooladrumman, a townland near Drumcliff in this territory.

This territory, under the shadow of Benbulbin (from the Irish: Binn Ghulbain), is where Conall Gulbain set out to conquer Tír Chonaill, modern Donegal. Cairbre Drom Cliabh remained closely associated politically with the Cenel Conaill but pressure from the Kingdom of Breifne continued and various kings were imposed by them:

1029 - Annals of Tigernach: "A great loss of life on Inis Lainne in Cairbre Mór, where forty persons of the nobles of Cairbre were burned alive, including Aodh Ó Ruairc, king of Cairbre, and the superior of Drumcliff.

— AFM

It may have covered a larger area before the twelfth century when conquered by Tigernán Ua Ruairc of Breifne. It was then taken over by Brian Luighnech Ua Conchobhair of the O'Conchobar dynasty sept called the Clann Aindrias or Ó Conchobhair Sligigh in the period of instability following the Norman conquest of Ireland. He was killed in 1181 at Magh-Diughbha in Crich Coirpre with his brother Maghnus by the Cenel Conaill.

In 1051 AD Cathal, son of Tighearnain, lord of Breifne, went upon a predatory excursion into Eabha, and demolished Dun-Feich, where fifty persons were slain, and whence seven hundred cows were carried off.

In 575 AD the monastery of Drumcliff was founded by Saint Colmcille.

== Norman era ==
As a border territory it was granted to Norman adventurer Philip de Angelo (Costello, Irish: Mac Coisdealbhaigh) one of the brothers of Gilbert de Angulo. This was one of a number of grants to outlawed Norman lords at this time by Cathal Crobhdearg, King of Connacht who was seeking help against his enemies in Ulster. Gilbert and his brothers led the forward policy against Cenel Conaill on behalf of the king but Gilbert was killed at Ballyshannon in 1213.

1214.7 - The territory of Carbury County Sligo, the possession of Philip Mac Costello, was preyed by Ualgarg O'Rourke, who carried off a number of cows. [In Norman hands in a grant from the King of Connacht].

Following the invasion of Connacht by Richard Mór de Burgh in the 1230s Maurice FitzGerald, 2nd Lord of Offaly of the FitzGerald dynasty was granted lands and established the castle, port and town of Sligo. He was to the forefront of pushing the frontier against Tir Conaill and Tir Eoghan until his defeat in the Battle of Creadran Cille at Ros Ceide in 1257.

1257 AD the Battle of Creadran Cille was fought between the Normans and Irish at Ros Ceite (Rosses Point).

The family fell out with the de Burghs later and were divested of their Connacht lands. This weakening of the Norman colony in Carbury and Sligo allowed the Clann Aindrias the space to establish the Lordship of Iochtar Connacht (Lower Connacht) in the wake of the Burke Civil War from their base, Caislen-conor in Fassacoille, now Bradcullen in the townland of Urlar.

Lines of the original Cenel Cairbre Drom Cliabh survived quasi-anglicised as 'Stone' (from O'Mulclohy) in Carbury and the O'Flanagan's of Tuatha Ratha, in the barony of Magheraboy, Fermanagh.

== Later Medieval era ==
In September 1588 three ships of the Spanish Armada were wrecked on the coast of Cairbre at Streedagh strand. The Spanish officer Francisco de Cuellar described the shipwreck and his subsequent adventures in a letter home in 1591. The wreck-site was rediscovered in 1985.

Sir Henry Sidney shired the county of Sligo, intended to replace the old Gaelic territory system.

=== Annal entries ===
In AD 542 the Battle of Sligo, in which Eogan Bél, king of Connacht, fell by Fergus and Domnall two sons of Muircheartach son of Erc, and by Ainmire son of Setna and by Naindid son of Dua who were the victors. Whence it was said:

The battle of Uí Fiachrach is fought,

With fury of edges over the border,

Foemen's kine bellow against spears,

The battle was spread out into Crinder.

The Sligo river carried off to the great sea

Men's blood with their flesh,

They utter paeans over Eba

Round the head of Eogan Bél. (AFM)

In 538 BC the battle of the Codnaige (Drumcliff river) fought by Tighernmas, king of Ireland.
