= O'Connor Sligo =

Gaelic-Irish noble family

Ó Conchobhair Sligigh (anglicised as O'Conor Sligo) is a Gaelic-Irish family and Chief of the Name.

The Ó Conchobhair Sligigh were a junior branch of the Ó Conchobhair Kings of Connacht.

They were descended from Brian Luighnech Ua Conchobhair (k.1181), a son of Irish High King Tairrdelbach Ua Conchobair and were Lords of Sligo into the 17th century. They were also referred to as Clann Andrias after a son of Brian Luighnech. The family first established themselves in the tuath of Cairbre Drom Cliabh and went on to become Lords of Lower Connacht (Íochtar Connacht), modern-day County Sligo, by taking advantage of Hiberno-Norman rivalry which led to the removal of FitzGerald dynasty holdings in the area by the House of Burke, who were the Lords of Connaught, and the collapse of their power in the Burke Civil War. In later centuries they attempted to hold off the O'Donnell dynasty of Tyrconnell, eventually having to acknowledge their overlordship before the collapse of the Gaelic order after the Nine Years' War.

== Chiefs of the Name ==
- Cathal Mac Domhnaill Ó Conchobhair Sligigh, 1318–1324.
- Muircheartach Mac Domhnaill Ó Conchobhair Sligigh, 1324–1329
- Maghnus Mac Cathail Ó Conchobhair Sligigh, 1329–1342.
- Cathal Óg Mac Cathail Ó Conchobhair Sligigh, 1342-3 November 1362.
- Tadhg mac Maghnusa O Conchobhair Sligigh, 1362–1368.
- Domhnall Mac Muircheartaigh Ó Conchobhair Sligigh, 1368-18 December 1395.
- Muircheartach Bachach Mac Domhnaill Ó Conchobhair Sligigh, 1395–1403.
- Brian Mac Domhnaill Ó Conchobhair Sligigh, 1403–1440.
- Eoghan Mac Domhnaill Ó Conchobhair Sligigh, 1440–1444.
- Toirdhealbhach Carrach Mac Domhnaill Ó Conchobhair Sligigh, 1444–1455.
- Maghnus Mac Briain Ó Conchobhair Sligigh, 1455–1461.
- Tadhg Mac Eoghain Ó Conchobhair Sligigh, 1461–1462.
- Domhnall mac Muircheartaigh Bhachaigh Ó Conchobhair Sligigh, 1462–1464
- Ruaidhrí Mac Briain Ó Conchobhair Sligigh, 1464-1478?
- Domhnall Mac Eoghain Ó Conchobhair Sligigh, 1478?-14 March 1494.
- Ruaidhrí Mac Toirdhealbhaigh Carraigh Ó Conchobhair Sligigh, 1494–1495
- Ruaidhrí Óg Mac Ruaidhrí Bhallaigh Ó Conchobhair Sligigh, 1495-1495.
- Feidhlimidh Mac Maghnusa Ó Conchobhair Sligigh, 1495–1519
- Tadhg Óg Mac Tadhg Ó Conchobhair Sligigh, 1533.
- Tadhg Mac Cathail Óig Ó Conchobhair Sligigh, 1533–1545. 1545-1552
- Ruaidhrí Mac Feidhlimidh Ó Conchobhair Sligigh, 1545–1552. 1552-
- Sir Domnhnall Ó Conchobhair Sligigh, c.1556-1588.
- Sir Donnchadh Ó Conchobhair Sligigh, 1588–1609.
- Sir Calbhach Ó Conchobhair Sligigh, 1609–1625.
- Donnchadh Mac Domhnaill Ó Conchobhair Sligigh, 1625–1634.
- Owen O'Conor Sligo, son of Martin son of Tadhg Óg brother of Sir Donnchadh, 1634-?
- Daniel O'Conor Sligo, son of Owen.
- Dermod O'Conor Sligo, son of Daniel.
- Charles O'Conor Sligo, son of Dermod.
- Lt-Gen. Daniel O'Conor Sligo, D. 7th of February, 1756 in Brussels. Served under Maria Theresia of Austria in the Austrian Army and was the last fully recognized chief of the O'Conor Sligo.
