= Sligo Way =

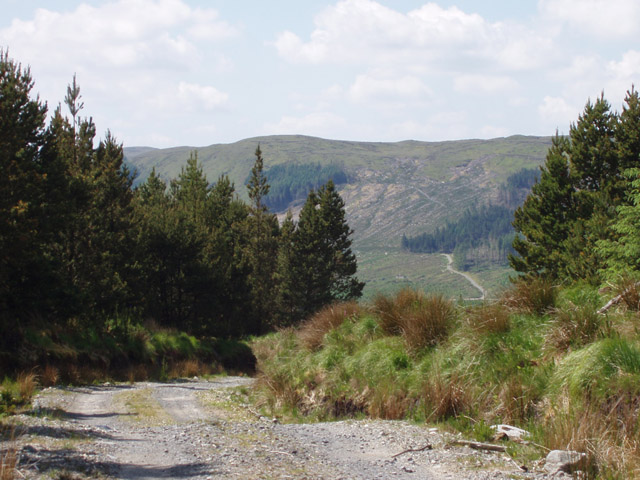
- Forestry road on the Sligo Way near Easky Lough
- Length: 78 km (48 mi)
- Location: Counties Sligo, Leitrim
- Designation: National Waymarked Trail
- Trailheads: Larrigan, Dromahair
- Use: Hiking
- Highest point: 890 metres (2,920 ft)
- Difficulty: Strenuous
- Season: Any

The Sligo Way (Irish: Slí Shligeach) is a long-distance trail mainly in County Sligo, Ireland. It is 78 kilometres (48 miles) long and begins in Larrigan, near Lough Talt and ends in Dromahair, County Leitrim. It is typically completed in three days. It is designated as a National Waymarked Trail by the National Trails Office of the Irish Sports Council and is managed by Sligo County Council, Sligo Integrated Development Company and the Sligo Walks Partnership.

Starting at the shores of Lough Talt, the trail crosses the Ox Mountains, via Easky Lough, to reach Coolaney and then follows roads to Collooney. From Collooney, it crosses Union Wood, past Ballygawley Lough, and, entering Slish Woods, follows the shore of Lough Gill to reach the end at Dromahair. The terrain consists of forest tracks, roads and moorland paths.

A review of the National Waymarked Trails in 2010 found low multiday usage and medium to high day usage of sections of the Sligo Way and recommended the proportion of walking on tarred roads (51%) be reduced and consideration given to developing the trail as a dual walking and cycling route.
