= Cloonacool =

Village in County Sligo, Ireland

Cloonacool Cluain na Cúile
- Village
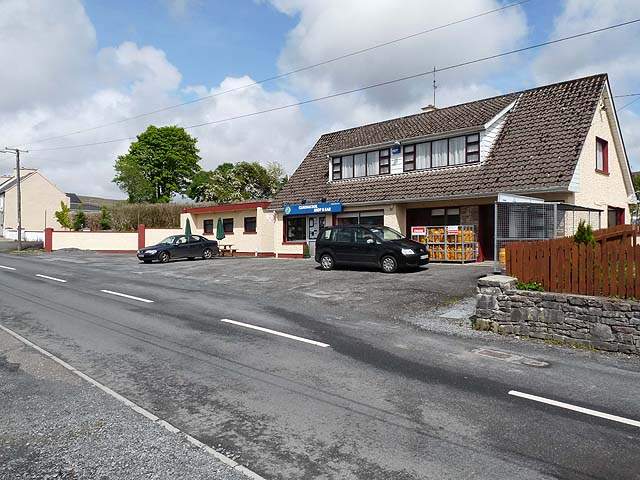
- Shop in Cloonacool

- Location in Ireland
- Coordinates: 54°06′07″N 8°46′39″W
- Country: Ireland
- Province: Connacht
- County: County Sligo
- Elevation: 67 m (220 ft)
- Time zone: UTC+0 (WET)
  - Summer (DST): UTC-1 (IST (WEST))
- Irish Grid Reference: G491172

Cloonacool (Irish: Cluain na Cúile, meaning 'meadow at the back') is a village and townland in County Sligo, Ireland.

Cloonacool sits at the foot of the Ox Mountains, about 6 km (4 mi) north-west of Tubbercurry and 15 km (9 mi) south-west of Coolaney. The Owenbehernagh and Mad Rivers run by the village to join the nearby River Moy. Bus Éireann route 479 from Sligo to Aclare serves the village.

== See also ==
- List of towns and villages in Ireland
