= Kilmactigue =

Townland in County Sligo, Ireland

Coordinates: 54.0375°N 8.9257°W

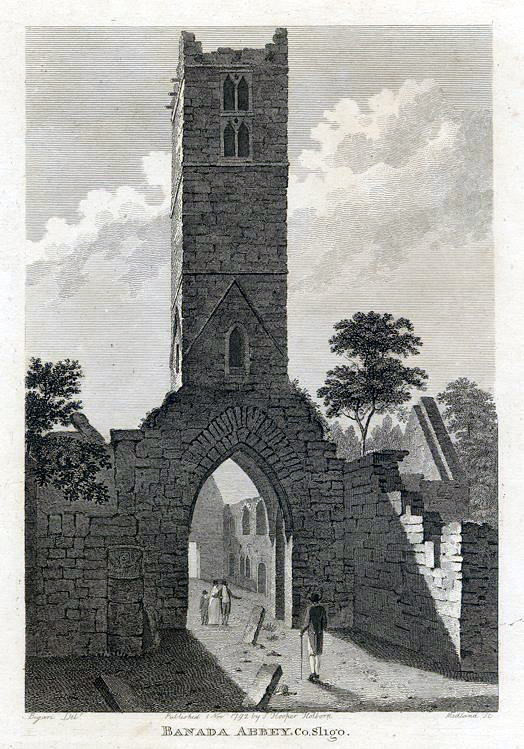
Banada Abbey in the 1790s

Kilmactigue, also Kilmacteige (Irish: Cill Mhic Thaidhg, meaning 'Mac Teige's church'), is a townland and Catholic parish in County Sligo, Ireland. Kilmacteige is also a civil parish.

The Catholic parish, in the Diocese of Achonry, covers the villages of Aclare, Banada and Tourlestrane, as well as their surrounding townlands. The parish church is situated in Tourlestrane, and there are smaller churches in Kilmactigue and Lough Talt. There was also a small church in Banada at the abbey, but it closed when the Banada Abbey secondary school was merged with the Marist Convent secondary school in Tubbercurry.

The parish patron saint is Saint Attracta, who is said to have defeated a dragon that was killing farmers' livestock. A local well is named after her, as is the new secondary school in Tubbercurry. Nearby is a neolithic era site - Cartronnmacmanus Court Tomb which has 11 stones leading to a chamber. The gallery has two parts each with a side chamber.
