= Ballygilgan =

Nature reserve in County Sligo, Ireland

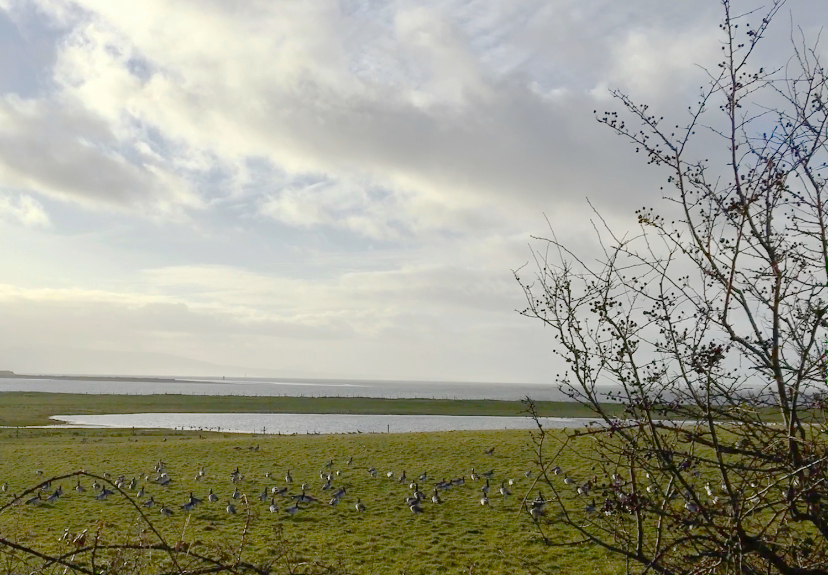
- Barnacle Geese grazing at Ballygilgan seasonal pond
- Interactive map of Ballygilgan
- Location: County Sligo, Ireland
- Coordinates: 54°20′28″N 8°32′56″W
- Area: 73 acres (0.30 km^{2})
- Governing body: National Parks and Wildlife Service

Ballygilgan also known as The Goose Field is a national nature reserve of approximately 73 acres (0.30 km^{2}) on the Maugherow Peninsula in County Sligo, Ireland. It is home to Ireland’s biggest mainland flock of barnacle geese. It is managed by the Irish National Parks & Wildlife Service.

== Features ==
Ballygilgan was legally protected as a national nature reserve by the Irish government in 1986. The nature reserve, also known as The Goose Field, goosefield, or Seafield is located near the Lissadell estate. The reserve was founded to protect the large number of barnacle geese who overwinter at the site, whose numbers were in decline in the 1970s.

During the summer months, the pasture is grazed by sheep and cattle. The name The Goose Field comes from the large numbers of barnacle geese who overwinter on the site, grazing and living at the seasonal freshwater pond. The population of geese is usually around 3000 birds, Ireland’s biggest mainland flock, which arrive in October and live at the reserve until April. Other waterfowl and waders also inhabit the site over winter, including teal and wigeon ducks, pintails, shovelers, redshanks, greenshanks, bar-tailed godwits, golden plovers, lapwings and dunlins. Chaffinches, bramblings, greenfinches, goldfinches, and buntings live near a cereal patch, in which oats and linseed have been planted, at the eastern end of the site.
