= Charlestown-Bellahy =

Villages in counties Mayo and Sligo, Ireland

Coordinates: 53°57′51″N 8°47′43″W

Charlestown–Bellahy (Irish: Baile Chathail–Béal Lathaigh) is an urban area crossing the boundaries of County Mayo and County Sligo in Ireland. It comprises the adjoining villages of Charlestown, County Mayo, and Bellaghy, County Sligo. It had a population of 753 at the 2002 census.
