= Athracht =

6th century Irish saint

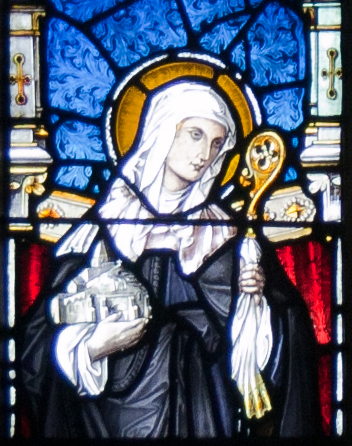
- Born: 6th century
- Died: 6th century
- Venerated in: Roman Catholic Church, Eastern Orthodox Church
- Feast: 11 August
- Patronage: Tourlestrane, County Sligo, Ireland

Athracht (Modern Irish Naomh Athracht; in Latin sources Attracta) is the patron saint of the parish of Locha Techet (Lough Gara) and Tourlestrane, County Sligo, Ireland. She was a sister of Bishop Conal of Drumconnell. Her feast day is 11 August.

== Life ==
A native of County Sligo, Athracht resolved to devote herself to God, but being opposed by her parents, fled to south Connacht and made her first foundation at Drum, County Roscommon, where her brother Conal had established a church. The place came to be called Drumconnell. From there she removed to Greagraighe or Coolavin, County Sligo. Her legend states that she took her vows as a nun under Saint Patrick at Coolavin. She then moved to Lough Gara, where she founded a hostel for travellers at a place now called Killaraght in her honour. The hostel survived until 1539. She was known for her charity and the hospitality extended to travelers and the homeless.

She lived in the sixth century, and is associated with Conainne. Local tradition remembers her great healing powers. Her convents were famous for hospitality and charity to the poor.

== Legacy ==
A local well is named after her, as is the new secondary school in Tubbercurry and the parish's second church in Kilmactigue.

St. Attracta's Senior School, Dublin is named after her.

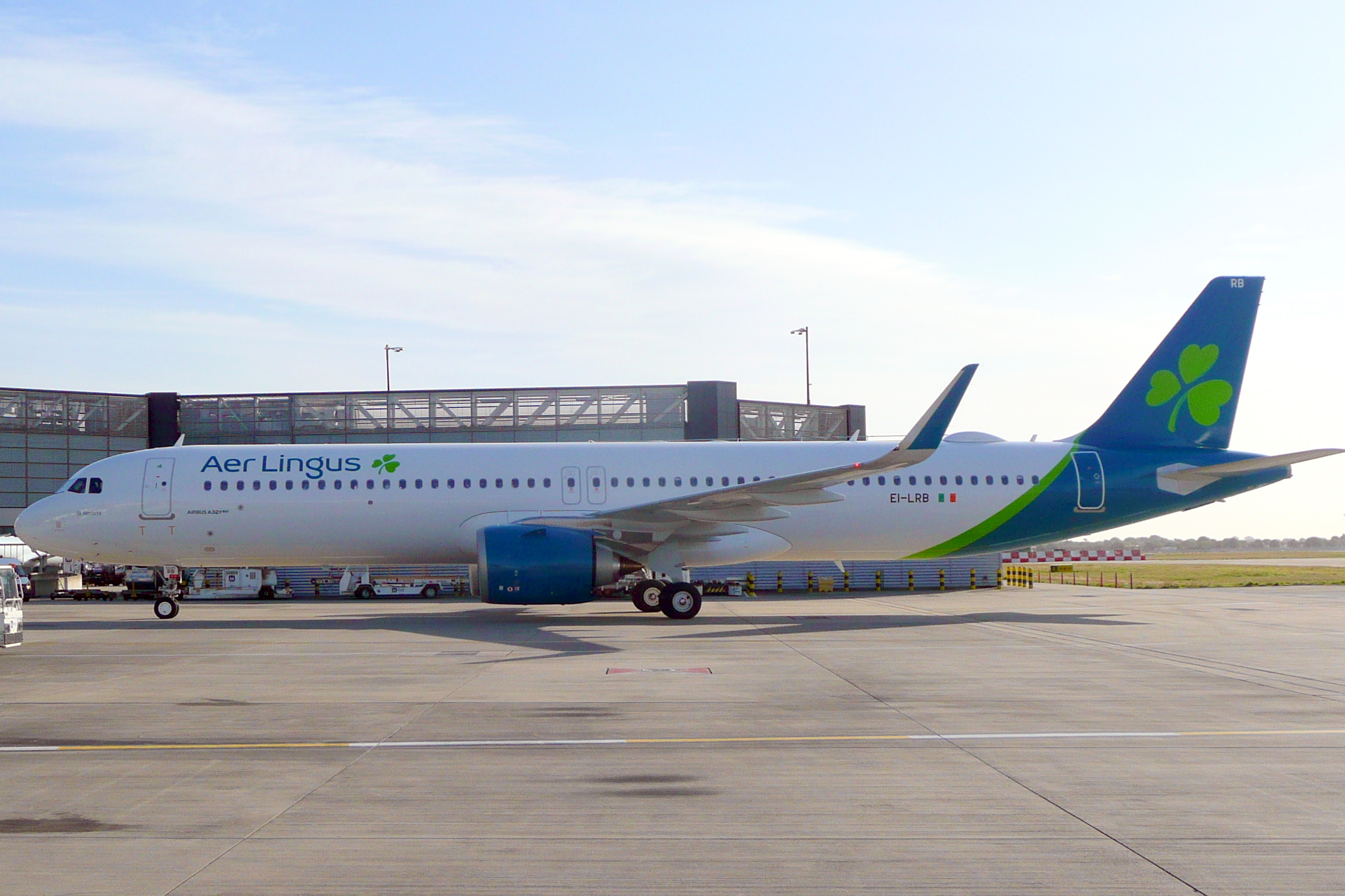
Airbus A321LR from Aer Lingus St. Attracta

In September 2019, Aer Lingus took delivery of Airbus A321LR registration EI-LRB and named it Saint Attracta.

== Bibliography ==
- st attracta

ISBN 0-14-051312-4.
