= Queen Maeve International Summer School =

Coordinates: 54.27925°N 8.46149°W

The Queen Maeve International Summer School, (Irish Scoil Samhraidh Miosgán Medbha) is one of Ireland's largest traditional music summer schools, held annually since 1999 and was founded by Sligo tin whistle player Carmel Gunning. During the week, students from around the world attend daily classes taught by experts in Irish music and dance. In addition, a full program of lectures, recitals, dances (céilithe) and exhibitions are run by the summer school.

All events take place at the Institute of Technology in Sligo Town, County Sligo, in the north west of Ireland, during the second week of August. The weekly registration includes six classes, all lectures and recitals (except for the Thursday night concert) and reduced price admission to céilithe. Lectures, recitals, concert and céilithe are open to the public.

== The school ==
Students from Zimbabwe to Israel attend the summer school. Students range from children and teenagers and unlike many other summer school the school caters for a large number of adults. All are mixed within classes according to level. It is possible during the week to attend classes in tin whistle, fiddle, flute playing, as well as sean-nós singing.

== See also ==
- Carmel Gunning
- Teada
- Dervish
