= Easky Lough =

- Loch Iascaí (Irish)
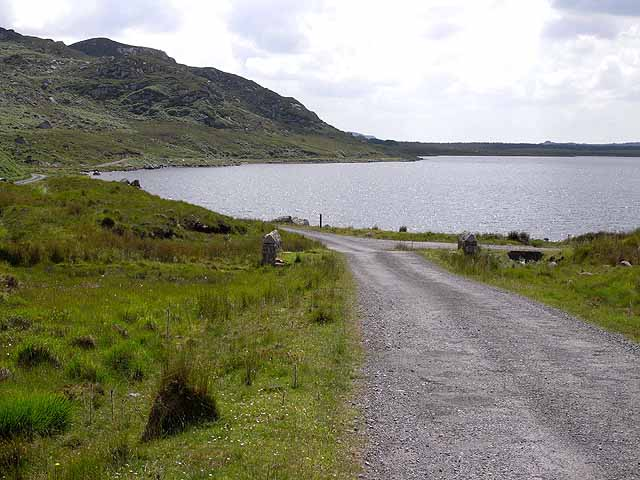

- Location in Ireland
- Location: County Sligo
- Coordinates: 54°9′17″N 8°51′3″W
- Lake type: Glacial lake
- Primary outflows: Easky River
- Catchment area: 10.8 km^{2} (4.2 sq mi)
- Basin countries: Ireland
- Max. length: 2.0 km (1.2 mi)
- Surface area: 1.19 km^{2} (0.46 sq mi)
- Average depth: 3 m (10 ft)
- Max. depth: 13 m (43 ft)
- Surface elevation: 180 m (590 ft)

Easky Lough (Irish: Loch Iascaí), also known as Easkey Lough or Lough Easky, is a freshwater lake in the northwest of Ireland. It is located in west County Sligo in the Ox Mountains.

== Geography ==
Easky Lough is located about 13 kilometres (8 mi) south of Easky village and 45 km (28 mi) by road from Sligo. It lies at an elevation of 180 m (590 ft) and covers an area of 1.19 square kilometres (0.5 sq mi).

== Hydrology ==
Easky Lough is fed by mountain streams entering at the lake's southeastern end. The lake drains north into the Easky River, which flows north to the Atlantic Ocean near Easky village.

== Natural history ==
Fish species in Easky Lough include brown trout, salmon and the critically endangered European eel. Easky Lough is part of the Ox Mountains Bogs Special Area of Conservation.

== See also ==
- List of loughs in Ireland
