= Knocknashee =

Marilyn in County Sligo, Ireland

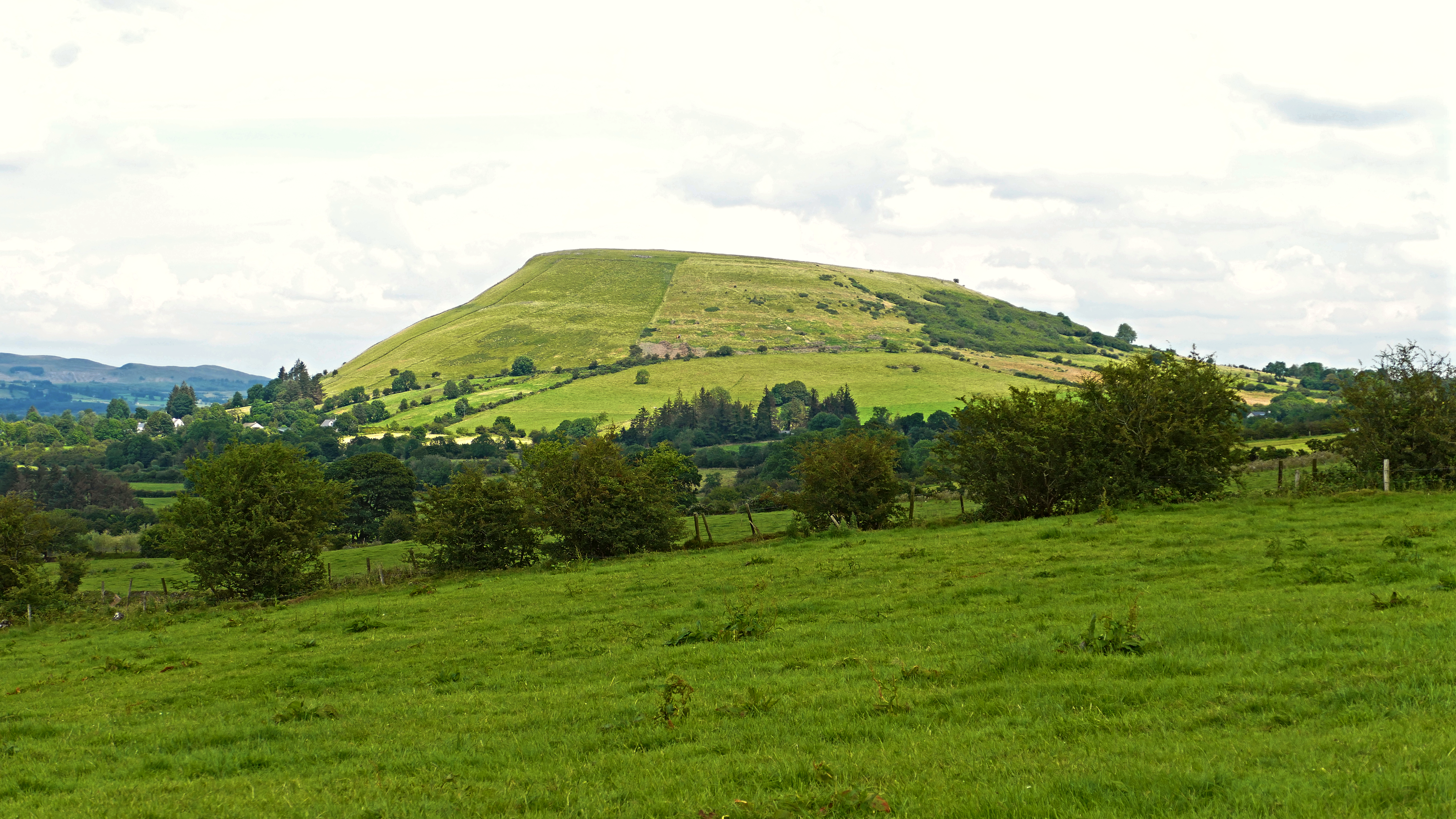

Highest point
- Elevation: 276 m (906 ft)
- Prominence: 171 m (561 ft)
- Listing: Marilyn
- Coordinates: 54°07′12″N 8°40′47″W

Naming
- Native name: Cnoc na Sí
- English translation: Hill of fairies

Geography
- Location within Ireland
- Location: County Sligo, Ireland
- Parent range: Ox Mountains
- OSI/OSNI grid: G556192

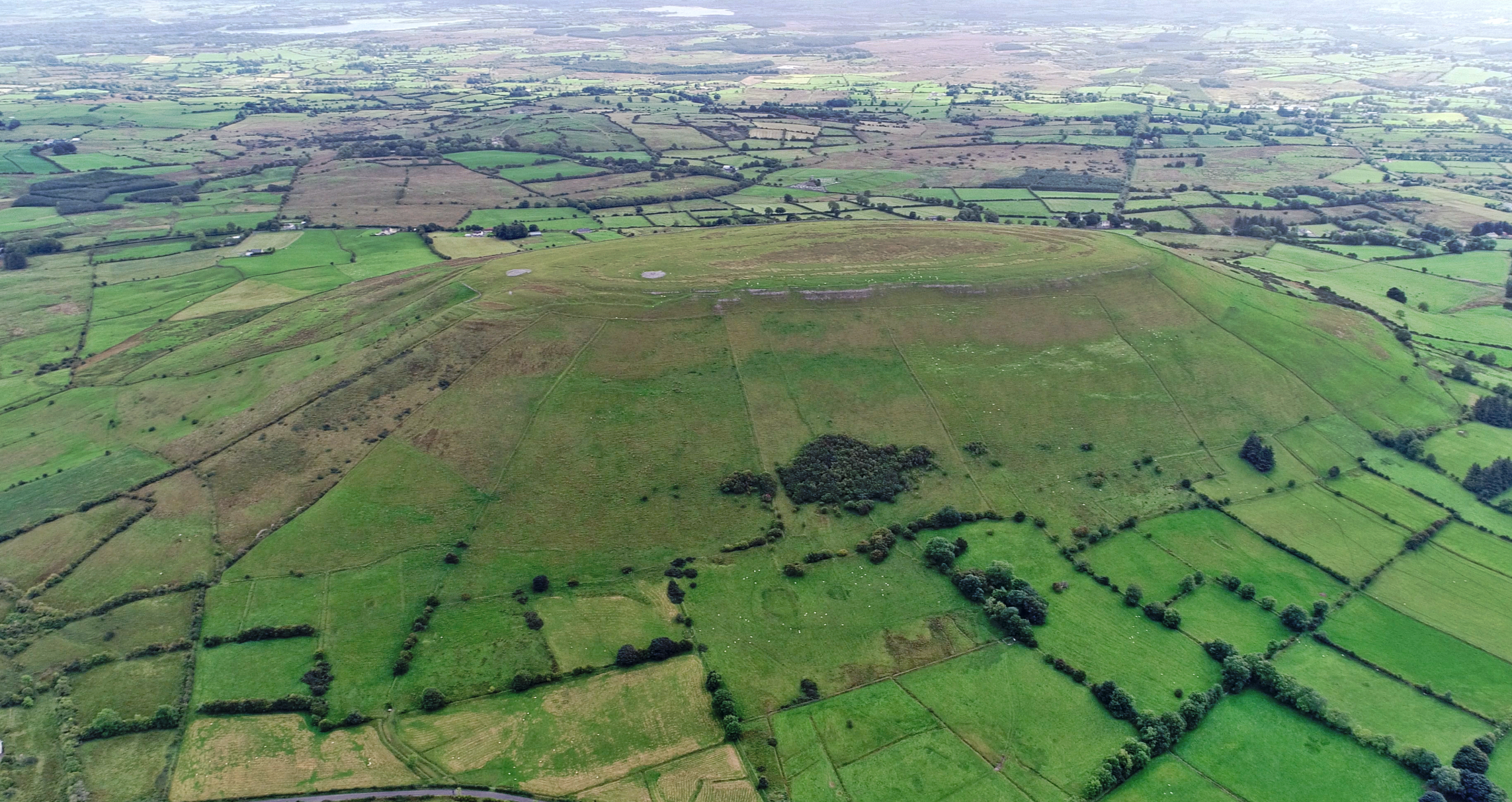

Knocknashee (Irish: Cnoc na Sí) is a 276-metre (906 ft) Marilyn in the Ox Mountains of County Sligo, Ireland.

== Geography ==
The River Moy rises at the foot of Knocknashee.

== Geology ==
Knocknashee hill consists of a limestone top with shales underlying the lower slopes.

== Archaeology ==
Knocknashee was identified as a hilltop fort in 1988. It is an enclosed hill fort with limestone ramparts containing cairns, burial chambers and 30 circular hutsites. The fort is 700 metres long and 320 metres wide and is enclosed by two earth and stone ramparts covering an area of 53 acres. This late Bronze Age site overlooks north Connacht, on a clear day Croagh Patrick can be seen in the south. The site was discovered during an aerial survey of county Sligo by the Office of Public Works in 1988.

== Name ==
The name of the plateau itself comes from Irish, ‘knock’ (cnoc) meaning ‘hill’ and ‘shee’ (sí) meaning ‘burial mound’ or 'of the fairies'. In older Irish Knocknashee is known as Mullinabreena.

== Popular culture references ==
"Knocknashee" was a play by Irish playwright Deirdre Kinahan. It was first produced 24 January 2002 in the Civic Theatre, Tallaght, Dublin 24.

"The Hills Of Knocknashee" is a traditional Irish song. The River Moy so gently flows from there unto the sea. Farewell to you, farewell to all from the hill of Knocknashee

"Knocknashee" with music by Neil Martin and lyrics by Brendan Graham.
