= Lough Talt =

- Loch Tailt (Irish)
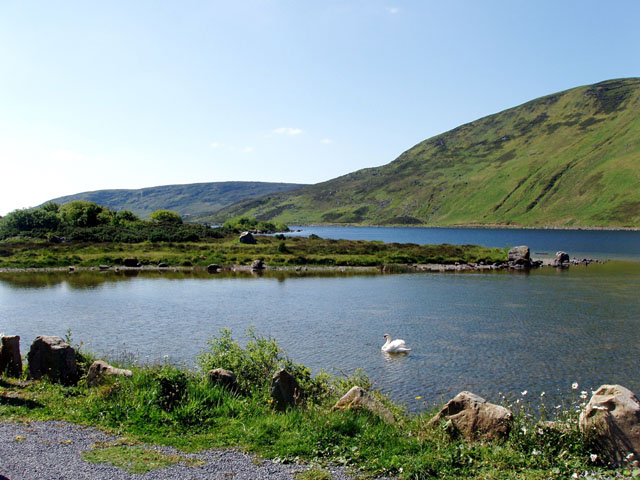

- Location in Ireland
- Location: County Sligo
- Coordinates: 54°5′0″N 8°55′30″W
- Lake type: Glacial lake
- Primary outflows: Lough Talt River
- Catchment area: 5.7 km^{2} (2.2 sq mi)
- Basin countries: Ireland
- Surface area: 0.97 km^{2} (0.37 sq mi)
- Max. depth: 40 m (130 ft)
- Surface elevation: 130 m (430 ft)
- Islands: 2

Lough Talt (Irish: Loch Tailt) is a lake in the Ox Mountains of south County Sligo, Ireland. The lake is located between the villages of Tubbercurry and Bonniconlon on the R294 road. Lough Talt is part of the Lough Hoe Bog Special Area of Conservation, an area of montane bogland and oligotrophic lakes.

Lough Talt is the largest of the lakes in the Lough Hoe Bog area. It is a glacier lake and lies at 130 metres (430 ft) above sea level and measures 40 m (130 ft) at its deepest point. Its area is about 1 km^{2} (0.39 sq mi). The lake flows out to the Lough Talt River which eventually joins the River Moy. The lake has two crannogs (artificial islands).

== Natural history ==
Fish species in Lough Talt include brown trout, three-spined stickleback, perch, the threatened Arctic char and the critically endangered European eel. Brown trout are the dominant fish species. A population of the endangered white-clawed crayfish has also been reported.

Lakeshore marshes support Vertigo geyeri, a wetland snail considered threatened in Europe. Bird life at the lake includes swans, ducks and dippers. One of the lake islands formerly supported a hundreds-strong colony of common and black-headed gulls. By 1992, the colony had diminished to four pairs.

== Walking trails ==
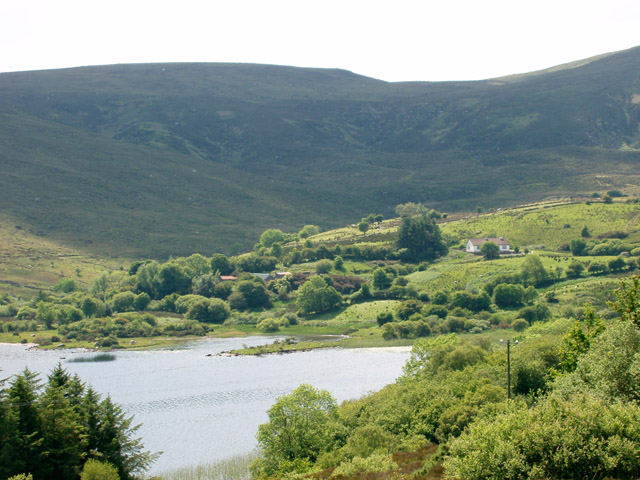
Lake view from Sligo Way

Lough Talt has a 5.5 km (3.4 mi) walking trail around its perimeter. Part of the trail shares the R294 road. The lake is also the starting point for the Sligo Way, an 80 km (50 mi) trail that ends in Dromahair, County Leitrim.

== Water supply ==
Lough Talt is the source of domestic treated water for a large percentage of the population in south County Sligo, including Tubbercurry and Ballymote. As of May 2019, a multi-year project to upgrade the Lough Talt Water Treatment plant began. The objective is to regain a safe drinking water standard and end the boil water notices the communities had been subject to.
