= Oisín Mac Diarmada =

Irish fiddler (born 1978)

- Born: 26 April 1978 (age 48); County Clare, Ireland
- Genres: Irish traditional music, Celtic music, folk music
- Occupations: Musician, music teacher
- Instruments: Fiddle, tin whistle, piano
- Years active: 1999–present
- Label: Ceol Productions

Oisín Mac Diarmada (born 26 April 1978) is an Irish fiddler.

== Biography ==
Oisín Mac Diarmada was born on 26 April 1978 in County Clare, and grew up in Crusheen. He started playing the fiddle from an early age, and began winning competitions at age eight. He also won Fiddle solo and Duet titles as the All-Ireland Junior Champion at Fleadh Cheoil in 1988.

In 1989, his family moved to County Sligo and Oisín attended the music school in Ballymote. He started studying classical piano at age 14.

In 1999, Oisín won the All Ireland Fiddle Champion at Fleadh Cheoil, and in 2000, graduated Trinity College, Dublin/RIAM (Royal Irish Academy of Music).

In 2001, Oisín and his friends including bouzouki/guitar player Seán Mc Elwain, bodhrán player Tristan Rosenstock formed the Irish traditional music group '’Téada.'’

In 2008, the Innisfree Céilí Band he join with brother Cormac and sister Máire became the first band from the North Connacht region to win the All-Ireland Senior Céilí Band Competition at Fleadh Cheoil.

As of 2016, he lived in Coolaney, County Sligo. With various music playing, he is the director of SCT (Scrúdu Ceol Tíre) Traditional Irish Music Examinations at CCÉ, and the Management of his record label Ceol Productions and his music management company Musical Ireland.

== Discography ==
solo

- Ar an bhFidil (2004, Green Linnet Records)
- The Green Branch / An Géagán Glas (2015, Ceol Productions)

with Seamus Begley

- Le Chéile / Together (2012, Ceol Productions)
- An Irish Christmas Soundscape (2012, Ceol Productions)

with Brian Fitzgerald and Michael Rooney

- Traditional Music on Fiddle, Banjo & Harp (2000, CIC (Cló Iar-Chonnacht) )

Irish Christmas in America

- Irish Christmas in America (2012, Ceol Productions)

Téada

- Téada (2003, Green Linnet Records)
- Give Us a Penny and Let Us Be Gone (2004, Green Linnet Records)
- Inné Amárach (Yesterday Tomorrow) (2006, Compass Records)
- Ceol & Cuimhne (Music And Memory) (2010, Gael-Linn Records)
- Ainneoin Na Stoirme (In Spite of the Storm) (2013, Ceol Productions)

Innisfree Céilí Band

- Music of North Connacht (2009, Ceol Productions)
