= Lissadell =

Area of County Sligo, Ireland

Lissadell (Irish: Lios an Daill Uí Dálaigh, meaning 'O'Daly's Court of the Blind') is the name of an area in north County Sligo on Magherow peninsula west of Benbulben. Until the late 16th century Lissadell was part of the tuath of Cairbre Drom Cliabh under the Lords of Sligo, Ó Conchobhair Sligigh. Lissadell is also now the name of the demesne which is attached to Lissadell House.

== History ==
The land was attached to Drumcliff Monastery from the 6th century, and was under the Ó Beóllán erenachs of Drumcliff. With the dissolution of the monasteries act coming into force in the west of Ireland after the Nine Years War the land was granted to Sir Paul Gore, a cavalry officer in the Elizabethan army. He built a fortified house at Ardtermon on the termon lands belonging to Drumcliff and is the ancestor of the Gore Booths of Lissadell house. His career is recounted in the Lissadell papers held in the northern Ireland Records Office.

"Paul, the founding Gore in Ireland, '... was commander of a troop of horse under Robert, Earl of Essex. He was ordered by Mountjoy to escort the last two Irish chieftains, Rory O'Donnell and Sir Donough O'Connor, to submit to Queen Elizabeth. He delivered them safely to Athlone and, in recognition, he was granted lands by the Queen. In 1608 he was ordered to take Tory Island which was occupied by a large number of Irish. He had only a small force but he contrived to set the Irish fighting among themselves and then massacred the victors. He was awarded more lands by James I in appreciation, created a baronet of Ireland in 1622 [and died in 1629]."

== Muireadhach Albanach Ó Dálaigh ==
Lissadell was the location in the 13th century of the important Ollamh of Poetry to the King of Tir Conaill Muireadhach Albanach Ó Dálaigh who killed a tax collector for his insolence with an axe here in 1213. He was forced into exile and fled to Scotland where he went on to found the MacVurich schools of poetry. It is believed he went on the fifth crusade to Damietta in Egypt. He was an early master of the formal Dán Díreach style of poetry. His presence here indicates a school of poetry was in existence in the 12th and early 13th century.
