= Knockalongy =

Mountain in Ireland

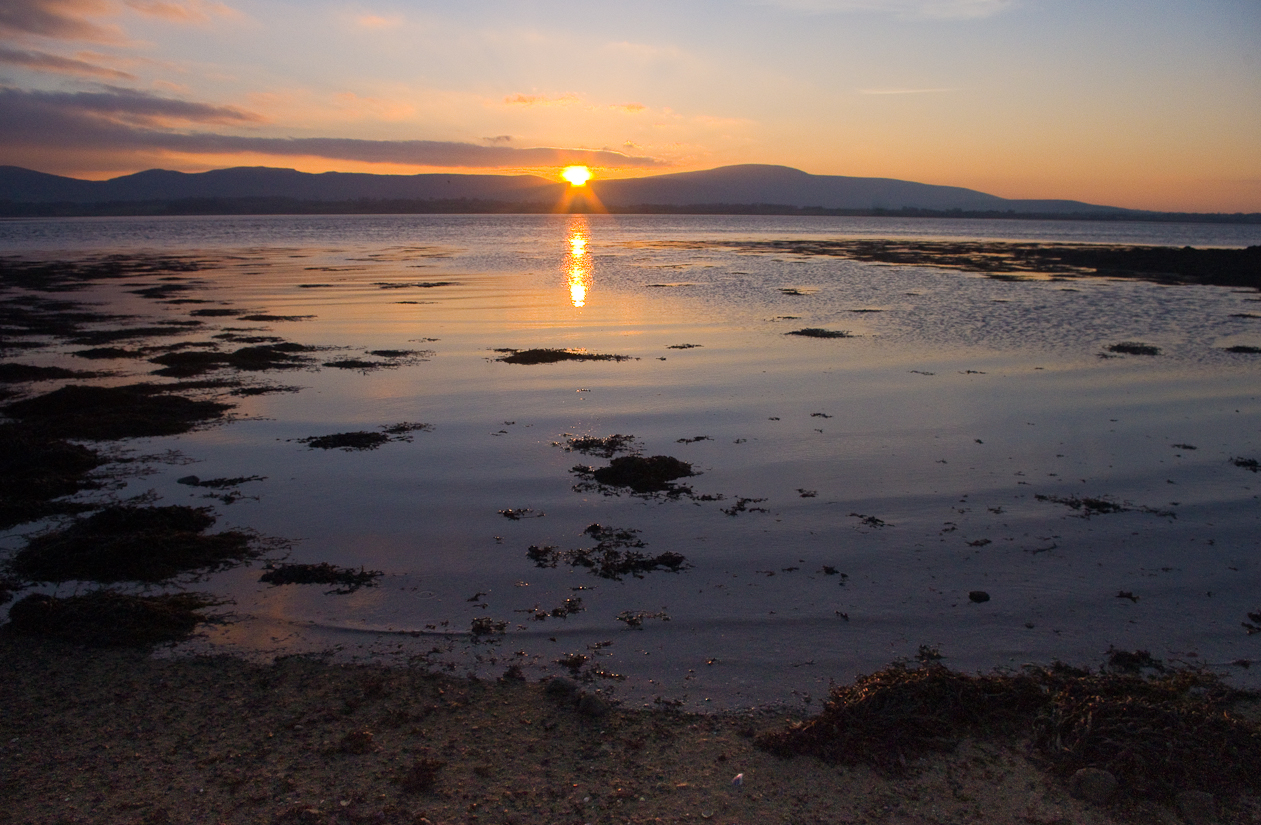

Highest point
- Elevation: 544 m (1,785 ft)
- Prominence: 490 m (1,610 ft)
- Listing: Marilyn
- Coordinates: 54°11′39″N 8°45′37″W

Naming
- Native name: Cnoc na Loinge
- English translation: hill of the encampment

Geography
- Location within Ireland
- Location: County Sligo, Ireland
- Parent range: Ox Mountains
- OSI/OSNI grid: G504275

Knockalongy (from Irish Cnoc na Loinge, meaning 'hill of the encampment') is a 544-metre (1,785 ft) Marilyn in County Sligo, Ireland. It is the highest of the Ox Mountains. The nearest village is Skreen.

There are many megalithic tombs on the plain between Knockalongy and Sligo Bay to the north. There are also two small lakes at the foot of the mountain—Lough Aghree and Lough Minnaun.

== See also ==
- List of mountains in Ireland
