= 2004 Sligo Senior Football Championship =

Gaelic football competition

Tournament details
- County: Sligo
- Year: 2004

Winners
- Champions: Tourlestrane (7th win)
- Manager: Anthony Brennan
- Captain: Eamonn O'Hara

Promotion/Relegation
- Promoted team(s): Calry/St. Joseph's
- Relegated team(s): Castleconnor (later re-instated)

This is a round-up of the 2004 Sligo Senior Football Championship. Tourlestrane won the title for the seventh time, defeating St. Mary's after a replay. Castleconnor were relegated, but early in 2005 the club requested that they remain in the Senior grade, which was agreed.

== Group stages ==
The Championship was contested by 14 teams, divided into two groups of four, and two of three. The top two sides in each group advanced to the quarter-finals, with the remaining sides facing the Relegation playoffs to secure Senior status for 2005.

=== Group A ===
| Date | Venue | Team A | Score | Team B | Score |
|---|---|---|---|---|---|
| 24 July | Markievicz Park | St. Mary's | 1-15 | Coolera/Strandhill | 0-12 |
| 25 July | Tubbercurry | Bunninadden | 4-8 | Castleconnor | 0-7 |
| 1 August | Markievicz Park | Coolera/Strandhill | 2-13 | Bunninadden | 1-6 |
| 1 August | Enniscrone | Castleconnor | 0-10 | St. Mary's | 0-8 |
| 29 August | Markievicz Park | Bunninadden | 0-9 | St. Mary's | 1-6 |
| 29 August | Easkey | Coolera/Strandhill | 1-6 | Castleconnor | 0-6 |

| Team | Pld | W | D | L | For | Against | Pts |
|---|---|---|---|---|---|---|---|
| Coolera/Strandhill | 3 | 2 | 0 | 1 | 3-31 | 2-27 | 4 |
| St. Mary's | 3 | 1 | 1 | 1 | 2-29 | 0-31 | 3 |
| Bunninadden | 3 | 1 | 1 | 1 | 5-23 | 3-26 | 3 |
| Castleconnor | 3 | 1 | 0 | 2 | 0-23 | 5-22 | 2 |

=== Group B ===
| Date | Venue | Team A | Score | Team B | Score |
|---|---|---|---|---|---|
| 24 July | Ballymote | Curry | 2-8 | St. John's | 0-7 |
| 24 July | Kent Park | Eastern Harps | 1-16 | Drumcliffe/Rosses Point | 0-6 |
| 1 August | Ballymote | Curry | 2-8 | Drumcliffe/Rosses Point | 1-3 |
| 1 August | Coola | Eastern Harps | 4-10 | St. John's | 0-9 |
| 29 August | Tubbercurry | Curry | 0-11 | Eastern Harps | 0-6 |
| 29 August | Kent Park | Drumcliffe/Rosses Point | 1-12 | St. John's | 0-10 |

| Team | Pld | W | D | L | For | Against | Pts |
|---|---|---|---|---|---|---|---|
| Curry | 3 | 3 | 0 | 0 | 4-27 | 1-16 | 6 |
| Eastern Harps | 3 | 2 | 0 | 1 | 5-32 | 0-26 | 4 |
| Drumcliffe/Rosses Point | 3 | 1 | 0 | 2 | 2-21 | 3-34 | 2 |
| St. John's | 3 | 0 | 0 | 3 | 0-26 | 7-30 | 0 |

=== Group C ===
| Date | Venue | Team A | Score | Team B | Score |
|---|---|---|---|---|---|
| 24 July | Coola | Ballymote | 2-9 | Easkey | 0-12 |
| 31 July | Tubbercurry | Tourlestrane | 1-10 | Ballymote | 0-8 |
| 28 August | Enniscrone | Easkey | 1-6 | Tourlestrane | 0-6 |

| Team | Pld | W | D | L | For | Against | Pts |
|---|---|---|---|---|---|---|---|
| Tourlestrane | 2 | 1 | 0 | 1 | 1-16 | 1-14 | 2 |
| Easkey | 2 | 1 | 0 | 1 | 1-18 | 2-15 | 2 |
| Ballymote | 2 | 1 | 0 | 1 | 2-17 | 1-22 | 2 |

=== Group D ===
| Date | Venue | Team A | Score | Team B | Score |
|---|---|---|---|---|---|
| 25 July | Markievicz Park | Tubbercurry | 2-9 | St. Molaise Gaels | 0-7 |
| 31 July | Markievicz Park | Shamrock Gaels | 0-12 | St. Molaise Gaels | 1-8 |
| 28 August | Ballymote | Shamrock Gaels | 0-10 | Tubbercurry | 0-10 |

| Team | Pld | W | D | L | For | Against | Pts |
|---|---|---|---|---|---|---|---|
| Tubbercurry | 2 | 1 | 1 | 0 | 2-19 | 0-17 | 3 |
| Shamrock Gaels | 2 | 1 | 1 | 0 | 0-22 | 1-18 | 3 |
| St. Molaise Gaels | 2 | 0 | 0 | 2 | 1-15 | 2-21 | 0 |

=== Playoffs ===
Two groups required playoffs. A week after their drawn game, St. Mary's and Bunninadden met again to decide second place in Group A. St. Mary's won out, though only after extra time. In Group C, Ballymote had defeated Easkey, but in the playoff the result was reversed, as Easkey edged through by the minimum.

| Group | Date | Venue | Team A | Score | Team B | Score |
|---|---|---|---|---|---|---|
| Group C | 4 September | Markievicz Park | Easkey | 1-10 | Ballymote | 1-9 |
| Group A (after extra time) | 5 September | Tubbercurry | St. Mary's | 0-16 | Bunninadden | 1-11 |

== Quarterfinals ==
The quarter finals of the Championship saw the demise of holders Curry, eliminated by St. Mary's. Elsewhere Coolera/Strandhill, Tourlestrane and Easkey won, Tourlestrane beating Shamrock Gaels after a replay. Eastern Harps' defeat to Coolera/Strandhill meant that the East Sligo club did not reach the last four for the first time in a decade.

| Game | Date | Venue | Team A | Score | Team B | Score |
|---|---|---|---|---|---|---|
| Sligo SFC; Quarter Final | 11 September | Markievicz Park | Tourlestrane | 1-5 | Shamrock Gaels | 1-5 |
| Sligo SFC; Quarter Final | 11 September | Kent Park | Easkey | 1-10 | Tubbercurry | 1-7 |
| Sligo SFC; Quarter Final | 12 September | Markievicz Park | Coolera/Strandhill | 0-13 | Eastern Harps | 1-5 |
| Sligo SFC; Quarter Final | 12 September | Ballymote | St. Mary's | 0-12 | Curry | 2-5 |
| Sligo SFC; Quarter Final Replay | 19 September | Markievicz Park | Tourlestrane | 1-10 | Shamrock Gaels | 0-9 |

== Semifinals ==
Both semi-final pairings had previously met in the group stages. St. Mary's repeated their victory over Coolera, but Tourlestrane, this time not having to travel to Tireragh, gained revenge over Easkey.

| Game | Date | Venue | Team A | Score | Team B | Score |
|---|---|---|---|---|---|---|
| Sligo SFC; Semi-Final | 25 September | Markievicz Park | St. Mary's | 0-11 | Coolera/Strandhill | 0-6 |
| Sligo SFC; Semi-Final | 25 September | Markievicz Park | Tourlestrane | 1-11 | Easkey | 2-4 |

== Last eight ==
Quarterfinals; 11 September/September 12
Coolera/Strandhill | 0-13
Eastern Harps | 1-5
St. Mary's | 0-12
Curry | 2-5
Easkey | 1-10
Tubbercurry | 1-7
Tourlestrane | 1-5, 1-10 (R)
Shamrock Gaels | 1-5, 0-9 (R)

Semifinals; 25 September
Coolera/Strandhill | 0-6
St. Mary's | 0-11
Easkey | 2-4
Tourlestrane | 1-11

Final; 17 October
St. Mary's | 2-5, 2-4 (R)
Tourlestrane | 1-8, 2-9 (R)

== Sligo Senior Football Championship Final ==
| Tourlestrane | 1-8 - 2-5 (final score after 60 minutes) | St. Mary's |
| Manager:Anthony Brennan Team: F. Kennedy; B. Kirrane; C. Neary; D. Henry; S. King; D. Durkin; D. Dunne; E. O'Hara (Capt); S. Dunne; B. Egan; M. Walsh (0-4); P. Brennan; J. Marren (1-1); G. McGowan (0-3); E. Haran Substitutes: B. Kennedy; S. Leonard | Half-time: 0-5 1-2 Competition: Sligo Senior Football Championship (Final) Date: Sunday, 17 October 2004 Venue: Markievicz Park, Sligo Referee: Eddie Watters (Coolera/Strandhill) | Manager:Glen Young Team: D. Morrissey; D. Carroll; J. Martyn (Capt); A. Collery; C. Carroll; J. Davey; C. Walsh; S. Burns (0-1); P. Mullen; N. Smith; G. Heavin (0-1); D. Caffrey; A. Rooney; M. Breheny (2-3); M. Rooney Substitutes: K. Casey; M. Butler; P. Newton |

== Sligo Senior Football Championship Final Replay ==
| Tourlestrane | 2-9 - 2-4 (final score after 60 minutes) | St. Mary's |
| Manager:Anthony Brennan Team: F. Kennedy; B. Kirrane; C. Neary; D. Henry; S. King; D. Durkin (0-1); D. Dunne; E. O'Hara (Capt) (1-0); S. Dunne (0-1); B. Egan; M. Walsh (0-3); S. Leonard; J. Marren; G. McGowan (0-4); E. Haran Substitutes: E. Walsh (1-0); P. Brennan | Half-time: 1-4 2-3 Competition: Sligo Senior Football Championship (Final) Date: Sunday, 24 October 2004 Venue: Markievicz Park, Sligo Referee: Dermot Mullaney (Enniscrone) | Manager:Glen Young Team: D. Morrisey; N. Murray; J. Martyn (Capt); A. Collery; C. Carroll; J. Davey; C. Walsh; S. Burns; P. Mullen; A. Boyle; G. Heavin; D. Caffrey; A. Roony; M. Breheny (0-3); M. Rooney (2-1) Substitutes: M. Butler; P. Newton; K. Farragher |

== Relegation ==
| Game | Date | Venue | Team A | Score | Team B | Score |
|---|---|---|---|---|---|---|
| Sligo SFC; Relegation Playoff | 11 September | Ballymote | Bunninadden | 0-10 | Drumcliffe/Rosses Point | 2-1 |
| Sligo SFC; Relegation Playoff | 11 September | Tubbercurry | St. Molaise Gaels | 0-8 | Castleconnor | 0-5 |
| Sligo SFC; Relegation Playoff | 12 September | Bunninadden | Ballymote | 1-7 | St. John's | 0-4 |
| Sligo SFC; Relegation Playoff | 18 September | Kent Park | Drumcliffe/Rosses Point | 2-6 | St. John's | 2-6 |
| Sligo SFC; Relegation Playoff Replay | 25 September | Kent Park | Drumcliffe/Rosses Point | 2-11 | St. John's | 1-10 |
| Sligo SFC; Relegation Final | 31 October | Kent Park | St. John's | 2-9 | Castleconnor | 0-8 |
