= Conal =

Irish bishop

Saint Conal
- Born: 5th century Ireland
- Died: c. 500; Ireland
- Venerated in: Roman Catholicism
- Major shrine: Drumconnell
- Feast: 22 May

Conal (or Conall) was an Irish bishop who flourished in the second half of the fifth century and ruled over the church of Drum, County Roscommon, the place being subsequently named Drumconnell, after St. Conal.

== Life ==
He was a brother of Attracta, who is said to have prophesied that the episcopal churches of St. Conall (Drumconnell) and St. Dachonna (Eas Dachonna) would be reduced to poverty, owing to the fame of a new monastic establishment. This prophecy was strikingly fulfilled, inasmuch as Drum and Assylin soon after ceased to be episcopal sees, while in 1148 the great Cistercian Abbey of Boyle was founded.

Conall died about the year 500, and his feast is celebrated on 22 May, though some assign 18 March or 9 February as the date.
