= Toorlestraun =

Village in County Sligo, Ireland

Toorlestraun Tuar Loistreáin
- Village
- St Attracta's Church

- Location in Ireland
- Coordinates: 54°02′23″N 8°50′33″W
- Country: Ireland
- Province: Connacht
- County: County Sligo
- Time zone: UTC+0 (WET)
  - Summer (DST): UTC-1 (IST (WEST))
- Irish Grid Reference: G448103

Toorlestraun or Tourlestrane (Irish: Tuar Loistreáin, meaning 'green field of the scorching') is a village in County Sligo, Ireland.

== Village ==
The village of Tourlestrane itself is the smaller of the two villages in the parish of Kilmactigue, the other being Aclare. It is a market centre for local dairy farmers, and the location of the main parish church.

The townland of Clooncagh (Cluain Chatha meaning "meadow of the battle") is located near the village and known for a 15th-century battle between two warring clans.

== Transport ==
Bus Éireann Fridays-only route 479 links the village with Sligo via Coolaney and Collooney

== Gaelic games ==
Toorlestraun is home to a Gaelic Athletic Association club, practicing gaelic football scene since the 1900s, and also in hurling in the county during the 1970s and 1980s.

== People ==
- Eamonn O'Hara, GAA Toorlestraun, Sligo intercounty, and International Rules player.

== See also ==
- List of towns and villages in Ireland
