= Aclare =

Village in County Sligo, Ireland

Aclare Áth an Chláir
- Village
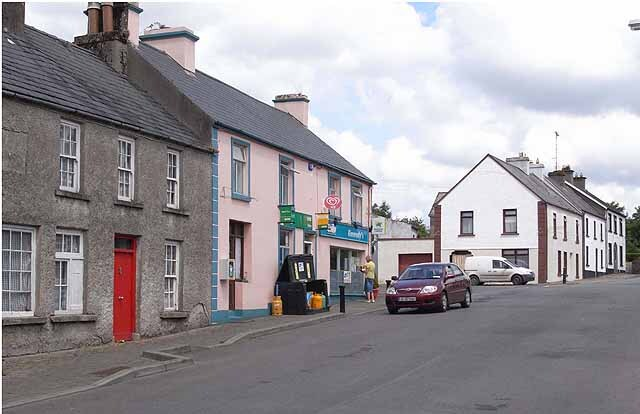
- Shop and post office in Aclare

- Location in Ireland
- Coordinates: 54.036°N 8.899°W
- Country: Ireland
- Province: Connacht
- County: County Sligo
- Elevation: 53 m (174 ft)
- Irish Grid Reference: G410097

Aclare (Irish: Áth an Chláir, meaning 'ford of the plain') is a village in County Sligo, Ireland. It lies within both the civil and Catholic parish of Kilmactigue. Aclare village is situated on the Inagh (also spelt "Eignagh") river, a tributary of the River Moy.

== History ==
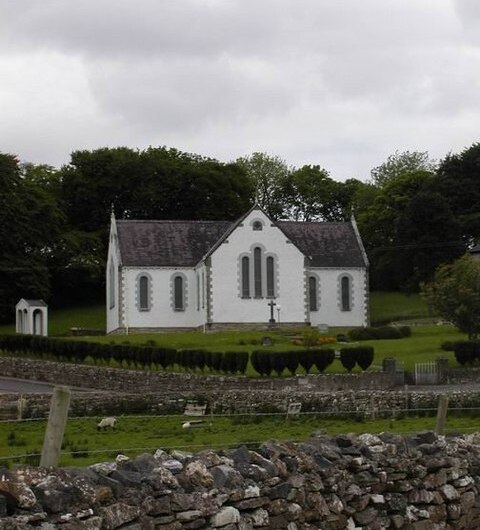
Kilmactigue Church, near Aclare, was built in 1898

Evidence of ancient settlement in the area includes a number of ringfort and enclosure sites in the townlands of Carns, Lislea and Kilmacteige.

Belclare Castle (Irish: Béal an Chláir, meaning 'mouth of the plain'), a ruined castle near the village in Belcare townland, is historically associated with the O'Hara clan. The castle is located about half a mile west of Kilmactigue Chapel and was originally built in the 15th century.

The Annals of Ulster and Annals of the Four Masters record that, in 1512, Belclare Castle and Aclare were the site of a battle between the O'Donnells of Donegal and the McWilliam Bourkes of Connacht.

== Transport ==
Bus Éireann route 479 links Aclare with Sligo via Tourlestrane, Coolaney and Collooney.

== Notable people ==
- Tommy Fleming, singer, was born in Aclare

== See also ==
- List of towns and villages in Ireland
