= Carney, County Sligo =

Carney Fearann Uí Chearnaigh
- Village
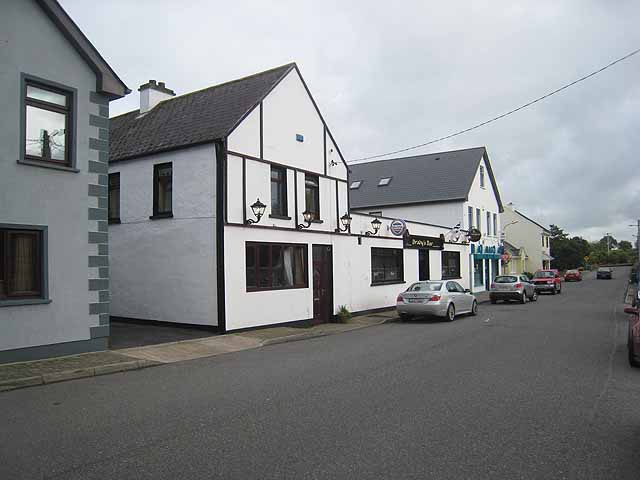
- Carney village centre

- Location in Ireland
- Coordinates: 54°20′26″N 8°31′38″W
- Country: Ireland
- Province: Connacht
- County: County Sligo
- Elevation: 8 m (26 ft)

Population (2022)
  - Total: 373
- Time zone: UTC+0 (WET)
  - Summer (DST): UTC-1 (IST (WEST))
- Irish Grid Reference: G657436

Carney (Irish: Fearann Uí Chearnaigh, meaning 'territory of Ó Ciarnaigh') is a village on the Maugherow Peninsula in County Sligo, Ireland. It is 8 km north of Sligo town (11 km by road).

== Transport ==
Bus Éireann route 474 (Sligo - Drumcliffe - Maugherow) serves the village on Saturdays throughout the year and Mondays to Fridays during the school term.

Transport for Ireland (TFI) route 982 (Sligo - Drumcliffe - Maugherow) serves the village every day of the week.

== See also ==
- List of towns in the Republic of Ireland
