= Eamonn O'Hara =

Irish Gaelic footballer (born 1975)

Personal information
- Native name: Éamonn Ó hEadhra (Irish)
- Born: 6 September 1975 (age 51) Tourlestrane, County Sligo

Sport
- Sport: Gaelic football
- Position: Midfielder
Club
- Years: Club
- 1992–: Tourlestrane
Club titles
- Sligo titles: 8
Inter-county
- Years: County
- 1994–2013: Sligo
Inter-county titles
- Connacht titles: 1
- All Stars: 1

Eamonn O'Hara (born 6 September 1975) is an Irish Gaelic football manager and former player. O'Hara was the longest-serving Gaelic footballer at senior level until 2013. He began playing in 1994 and officially retired from inter-county football on 14 May 2013.

O'Hara played for his local club, Tourlestrane and was also a prominent player for the Sligo county team. Despite his long tenure, he won just one All-Star during his career, although he was selected twice to represent Ireland in the International Rules Series.

== Playing career ==
O'Hara has had some success with his club team Tourlestrane, winning eight Sligo Senior Football Championships – in 1994, 1997, 1999, 2004, 2007, 2009, 2011 and 2013. He was also a member of the Benada Abbey team, which won the All-Ireland colleges B title in 1992, beating Edenderry in the final after a replay.

O'Hara made his senior Sligo debut in 1994. He was named at centre forward in the 2002 All-Star football team, becoming only the third Sligo player in history to get an All Star.

In 2001 and 2002, O'Hara played for Ireland against Australia in the International Rules Series.

O'Hara won a Connacht Senior Football Championship medal for Sligo in 2007. This victory made Sligo the Connacht champions for the first time since 1975.

O'Hara's inter-county career highlight was his scoring of a brilliant individual goal against Galway in the 2007 Connacht Senior Football Championship Final. His scoring ability earned him a sponsorship deal of gold boots through parent company Nike. In 2008, Sligo were beaten by Mayo and ended up in the Tommy Murphy Cup following on from a league campaign that brought relegation to Division 4 – O'Hara said he was ""embarrassed by the decline back into mediocrity.

In January 2013, O'Hara announced he would be taking a break from inter-county football due to work commitments, though he suggested he would return some day. In May 2013, RTÉ announced him as an addition to their GAA analysis panel. He predicted that Galway would beat Mayo and Sligo would beat London, and that Sligo and Galway would meet in the Connacht Final. In the end, Mayo saw off Galway, and London defeated Sligo.

O'Hara later announced his retirement from inter-county football and said, "while Gaelic football has been, and continues to be a massive part of my life, I believe after nearly two decades wearing the Sligo jersey, the time is right for me to step aside. I do so knowing that I was very privileged to have played for my county, my province and my country."

== Punditry ==
In 2013, Sligo's Gaelic football team encountered a notable setback in the Connacht Championship. During a national television appearance, former team member O'Hara voiced his dissatisfaction with the team's performance and publicly called for the resignation of the team's manager at the time, Kevin Walsh. The team's campaign in the championship commenced with a match against London, which resulted in a defeat for Sligo. This loss had historic implications as it marked London's first Connacht Championship victory since 1977, only the second such victory in their history.

While O'Hara expressed his concerns on live television, the broader sports coverage predominantly focused on other significant matches of the day. Most notably, the reigning All-Ireland Champions, Donegal, triumphed over Tyrone in a high-profile encounter. Pat Spillane, a well-known sports analyst, shared the studio with O'Hara and expressed his surprise at the tumultuous state of affairs within the Sligo county team, highlighting the unexpected contrast with the traditionally strong footballing county of Kerry.

There are a lot of problems within the county board from the top down. There is a lot of infighting and a lot of resignations at county board level. We have a centre of excellence that is at a standstill. The keys should be handed over on 1 June and that is not going to happen. There are a lot of problems there and Kevin Walsh's results over the last two years have gone unnoticed because of this infighting. He hasn't been held accountable to this. We got to a Connacht final last year but we're papering over the cracks. There are players there that deserve better quality of training and management and I think going forward Kevin should make the right decision for the sake of Sligo football and not anybody else.

Then O'Hara called Walsh "crazy."

Kevin Walsh came at the start of the year and he decided that he wanted full commitment from everybody from 1 November. He was asking players for commitment and a big commitment at that stage but he hadn't accepted the Sligo manager role at that stage. There were reports he had shown interest in the Roscommon job and he was waiting for that to come through, in terms of would he get it, or would he get an interview. For me, he was asking me at 37 years of age to commit to a training regime of four nights a week collective sessions on 1 November, it was crazy as far as I was concerned. Unfortunately work and everything else conspired against me committing to that and I said I would be available from 1 January. [...] Kevin Walsh made big calls this year and last year. Every one of them has come back to backfire against him. For me I think he lost the players throughout the year. [...] But they deserve better training sessions. They deserve better quality in terms of tactical awareness and stuff like that and that hasn't come. Kevin Walsh has a lot to answer for.

Former Armagh footballer Oisín McConville said O'Hara was out of line with his outburst and pointed out that most teams, apart from those to have played in that year's All-Ireland final, go back training in November. Following defeat to Derry in the next game and elimination from the Championship, Walsh resigned as Sligo boss.

== Managerial career ==
O'Hara has managed his club Tourlestrane.

He led his club to five consecutive Sligo Senior Football Championship titles. He then led Mohill to two consecutive Leitrim Senior Football Championship titles. While managing Roscommon GAA club Boyle, in July 2025, he was ratified as joint manager of the Sligo senior footballers with Dessie Sloyan.

== Honours ==
- 1 Connacht Senior Football Championship (2007)
- 1 All Star (2002)
- 1 National Football League Division 3 (2010)
- 1 National Football league Division 4 (2009)
- 1 International Rules Series (2001)
- 1 All-Ireland B Colleges (1992)
- 8 Sligo Senior Football Championships (1994, 1997, 1999, 2004, 2007, 2009, 2011, 2013)
