= Téada =

Traditional Irish musical group

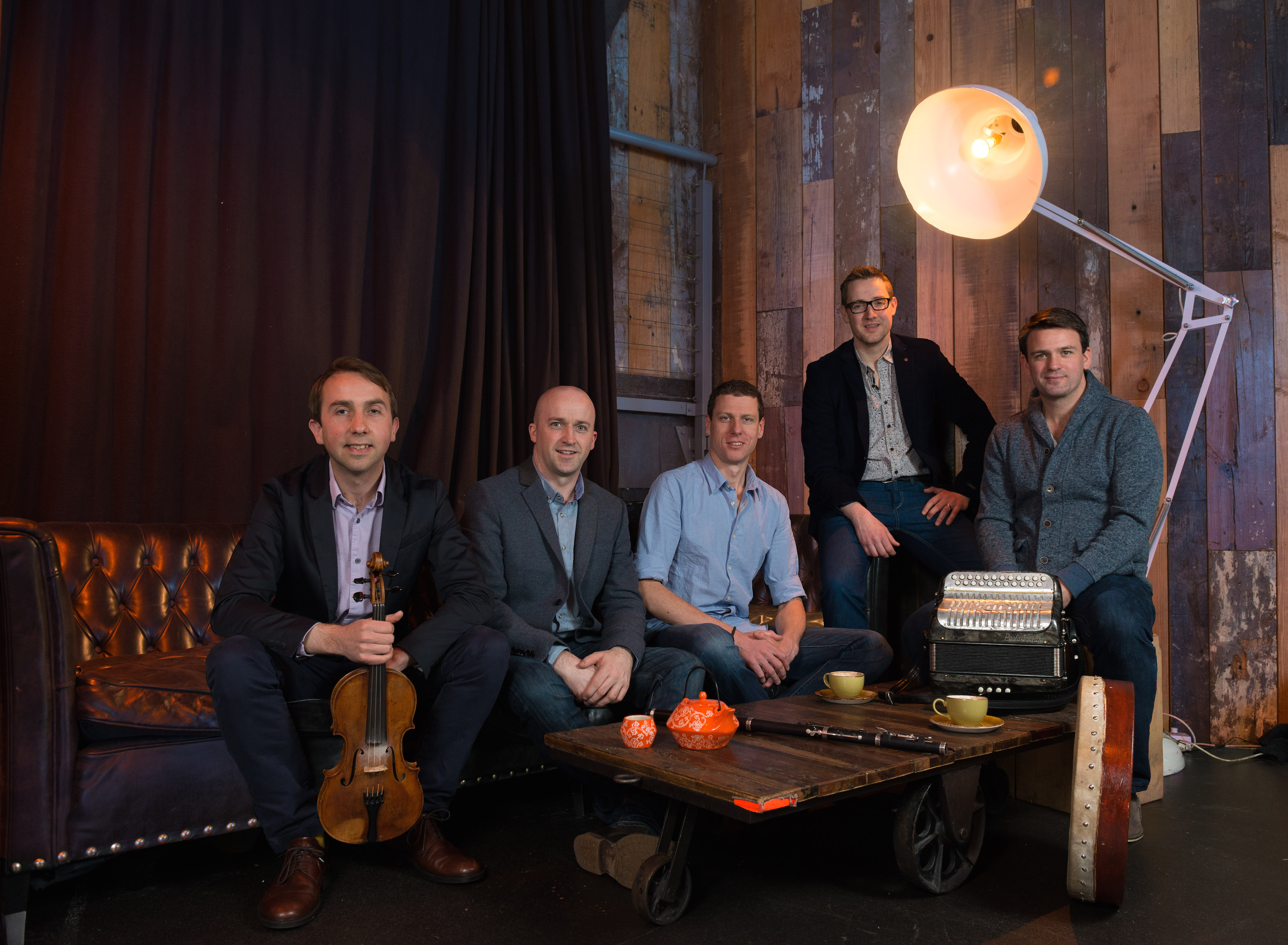
- Téada in 2015

Background information
- Origin: Ireland
- Genres: Irish music
- Years active: 2001–present
- Labels: Gael Linn, Green Linnet Records
- Members: Oisín Mac Diarmada; Paul Finn; Damien Stenson; Seán Mc Elwain; Tristan Rosenstock
- Past members: John Blake; Séamus Begley
- Website: http://www.teada.com/

Téada is an Irish traditional music band. The band's name is Irish for "strings". The five members of the band are fiddle player Oisín Mac Diarmada, button accordion player Paul Finn, Damien Stenson performs on flute, Seán Mc Elwain switches between the bouzouki and guitar and bodhrán player Tristan Rosenstock.

In 2001, through an appearance on the Irish television series, Flosc, Téada first came to national attention. When their eponymous debut album Téada was released, The Irish Times lauded the band for "keeping the traditional flag flying at full mast," and Scotland's Edinburgh Evening News wrote, "If there is a better new band on the Emerald Isle, they must be very, very good."

== Current members ==
=== Oisín Mac Diarmada ===
Oisín is a County Clare-born but Sligo-raised graduate of Trinity College, Dublin in Music Education 1999 All Ireland Fiddle Champion. He plays the fiddle with Téada and also works as a fiddle tutor. His other skills include lecturing and production work. Mac Diarmada has released some solo work, most notably Ar an bhFidil.

=== Paul Finn ===
Paul is a Laois native and plays the button accordion with Téada. He is known to have a pulsating and rhythmic yet traditional performance style on the accordion.

=== Damien Stenson ===
Hailing from County Sligo, Stenson has featured on a number of recent albums including the compilation "Wooden Flute Obsession Vol. 2".

=== Seán McElwain ===
From Ballinode, County Monaghan but now resident in County Dublin, Seán McElwain plays banjo, guitar and bouzouki with the group. He has recently completed doctoral studies at DKIT examining the musical heritage of the Sliabh Beagh area of Monaghan / Fermanagh. This research has resulting in an acclaimed album entitled 'Our Dear Dark Mountain with the Sky Over it', which has reunited regional repertoire recovered during his doctoral research with some of the region's current musicians. Described by The Irish Times' reviewer Siobhán Long as " a feast for local and curious eared visitor alike", the album has earned plaudits for shedding new light on the musical traditions of the region. It was awarded a prestigious TG4 Gradan Ceoil in 2016. A publication of the same name was released in 2023 (www.oddm.ie)

=== Tristan Rosenstock ===
Tristan plays the bodhrán with Téada on all of the albums to date. He is from Glenageary, on the southside of County Dublin in Ireland. Rosenstock studied Irish and Old Irish at Trinity College, Dublin. Tristan's interest in traditional Irish music has developed through his years at school in Irish medium education in Scoil Lorcáin and Coláiste Eoin. Rosenstock is the son of Irish language poet Gabriel Rosenstock

== Discography ==
=== Téada (2003) ===
Téada's eponymous debut album was released in 2003 back when Téada had four group members. This album featured John Blake on the flute, guitar, piano and whistle, Oisín Mac Diarmada on the fiddle, piano, whistle and vocals, Seán McElwain on the banjo, bouzouki and backing vocals and Tristan Rosenstock on the bodhrán and backing vocals.

1. Tom O'Connor's/The Joy of My Life/Handy with the Stick (hornpipes & jigs)
2. Teresa Halpin's/Rathlin Island/Michael Hynes' (reels)
3. The Surround/Up in the Garret/Port na Deorai (slip jigs)
4. Peigin's Peadar (song)
5. Micho Russell's/Bill Harte's/The Green Gates (reels)
6. The Chaffpool Post/The Mayday Hornpipe (barndance & hornpipe)
7. The Liffey Banks/Pat Molloy's (reels)
8. A bhean A' Tí (song)
9. Tom Roddy's/The Old Firm Jig/The Maid at the Well (jigs)
10. Rossinver Braes (hornpipe)
11. The Crock of Gold/Johnny's Gone to France/The Tailor's Thimble (reels)

=== Lá an Dreoilín (2004) ===
Also released as Give Us a Penny and Let Us Be Gone, Lá an Dreoilín was the first album to feature all five band members.

1. Brid Thomais Mhurchadha
2. The Stepping Stone/An Tseanbhean Bhocht
3. The League Reel/Peter Horan's/The Flannel Jacket
4. The Ace And Deuce of Piping
5. Humours of Lissadell/Maude Miller/The Jolly Tinker
6. Thios I Dteach An Toraimh
7. Highland Chluain Ard/Clarke's/The Foxhunter's Jig/The Old Maid
8. John Egan's/Saunder's Fort
9. Tom Cawley's/Ta An Coilleach Ag Fogairt An Lae/Rowsome's/Clancy's
10. The Trip We Took Over The Mountain
11. King of the Pipes/Queen of the Fair/The Woodcock
12. Píopa Ainde Mhoir
13. The North Wind/Up Roscommon/Sporting Nell
14. The Green Blanket/Up Sligo/Up Leitrim

=== Inné Amárach (2006) ===
Inné Amárach (Yesterday Tomorrow) was released in 2006.

1. Lady Montgomery's, Follow Me Down To Carlow, Give The Girl Her Fourpence, Jenny Tie Your Bonnet (reels)
2. The Tenpenny Piece, James Kelly's, Comb Your Hair And Curl It (jigs)
3. Jamesy Gannon's, McDermott's, Over The Moor To Peggy (march, barndance, reel)
4. Tá Dhá Ghabhairín Bhuí Agam, The Shelf (polkas)
5. Nóra Críona (air)
6. Delia Keane's, The Horse's Leotard, Seán Buí, The Dawn Chorus (jigs)
7. The Ebb Tide, Peter Wyer's (hornpipes)
8. Sarah's Delight, Paddy Seán Nancy's, The Ireland We Knew, The Ewe Reel (reels)
9. Planxty Crilly, Micho Russell's, Mickey Callaghan's (planxty, polka, slide)
10. Port Aitheantais na gCaipíní, Johnny's So Long At The Fair (jigs)
11. Bonnie Ann, John Kelly's, The Boy In The Boat (reels)

=== Ceol is Cuimhne (2010) ===
Ceol is Cuimhne (Music And Memory) was released in 2010.

1. Miss Cassidy's/All Around The Room/The Ballintra Lass (reels)
2. The Bog of Allen/Eanach Dhúin/Bill the Weaver's (jigs)
3. Poitín March/Devlin's/Basket of Oysters/Crotty's Glory (march/polka/fling/reel)
4. The Russians are Coming/The Miller's Daughter/The Boston-Sligo Reel (reels)
5. Murty Rabbett's/Gan Ainm from Grier Manuscript/The Crossroads Dance (polka/slip jig/jig)
6. Danny O'Mahony's/The Stormy Night/Paddy Cronin's (jigs)
7. A Sligo Air/ Sally Gally (air/jig)
8. Ríl Liadroma/The Green Cockade/The Mourne Mountains (reels)
9. Granuaile Barndance/The Circus Polka (barndance/polka)
10. Clothiers (air)
11. Paddy Fahy's/Séamus Mór McKenna's (reels)

=== Ainneoin Na Stoirme (2013) ===
Ainneoin Na Stoirme (In Spite of the Storm) was released in 2013.

1. Dinny O'Brien's/The Sweetheart Reel/Paddy Kenny's (reels)
2. An Spailpín Fánach (song)
3. Deálaí's, No. 1 & 2/The Peeler and the Goat (slides)
4. The Reel With the Birl/Carraigín Ruadh/Ryan's Rant (reels)
5. Pé in Éirinn Í (song)
6. The Jig of the Dead/I Have a House of My Own With a Chimney Built On the Top of It/Paddy Breen's/The Bird's Call (jigs/slip Jig)
7. Saddle Tramp (song)
8. Gone for His Tea/Joe Derrane's/All About Weaving (slow reel/barndances)
9. Brísdín Bréide/The Thatched Cabin/Morning Sunday (jigs)
10. Ar a Mbóithrín Buí/Tell Me Now (song/waltz)
11. James Murray's/Porthole of the Kelp/The Watchmaker/The Spinning Wheel (reels)

=== Coiscéim Coiligh (2022) ===
Also released as As the Days Brighten.

1. Ar Mhuin na Muice / Cairo Barry / Garranmore / Hunter Billy's (reels)
2. The Snowy-Breasted Pearl (song)
3. Paddy from Aghera / Bottle of Cop On / Kitty Seán Cunningham's (slow reels / barndance)
4. Greta's Favourite / Grist for the Mill / Ríl Johnny Phádraig Pheter (reels)
5. Eileen Óg (song)
6. The Women of Monaghan / Nancy Hynes' / Tap the Barrel (jigs)
7. Among Friends / Hornpipe No. 139 / The Staten Island (march, hornpipe, slow reel)
8. Oileán Dhún an Óir (song)
9. The Cauliflower / Tom Busby's / A Tribute to Jim (jigs)
10. Eochaill (song)
11. Farewell to Stoneybatter / An Raibh Tú ag an gCarraig / March at Kilmore (jig, air, march)
12. Paddy Ryan's Dream / The Winding Roads of Advance / Danny Meehan's / Mick Fitzpatrick's (reels)
