= Bellaghy, County Sligo =

Bellaghy Béal Lathaí
- Town
- Location in Ireland
- Coordinates: 53°57′51″N 8°47′39″W
- Country: Ireland
- Province: Connacht
- County: County Sligo
- Elevation: 60 m (200 ft)

Population (2016)
  - Total: 1,033
- includes Charlestown, County Mayo
- Time zone: UTC+0 (WET)
  - Summer (DST): UTC-1 (IST (WEST))
- Irish Grid Reference: G479019

Bellaghy (Irish: Béal Lathaí), in County Sligo in Ireland, is a border-town adjoined to Charlestown, County Mayo.
