= Maugherow Peninsula =

Peninsula in County Sligo, Ireland

Coordinates: 54.357°N 8.614°W

Machaire Eabha
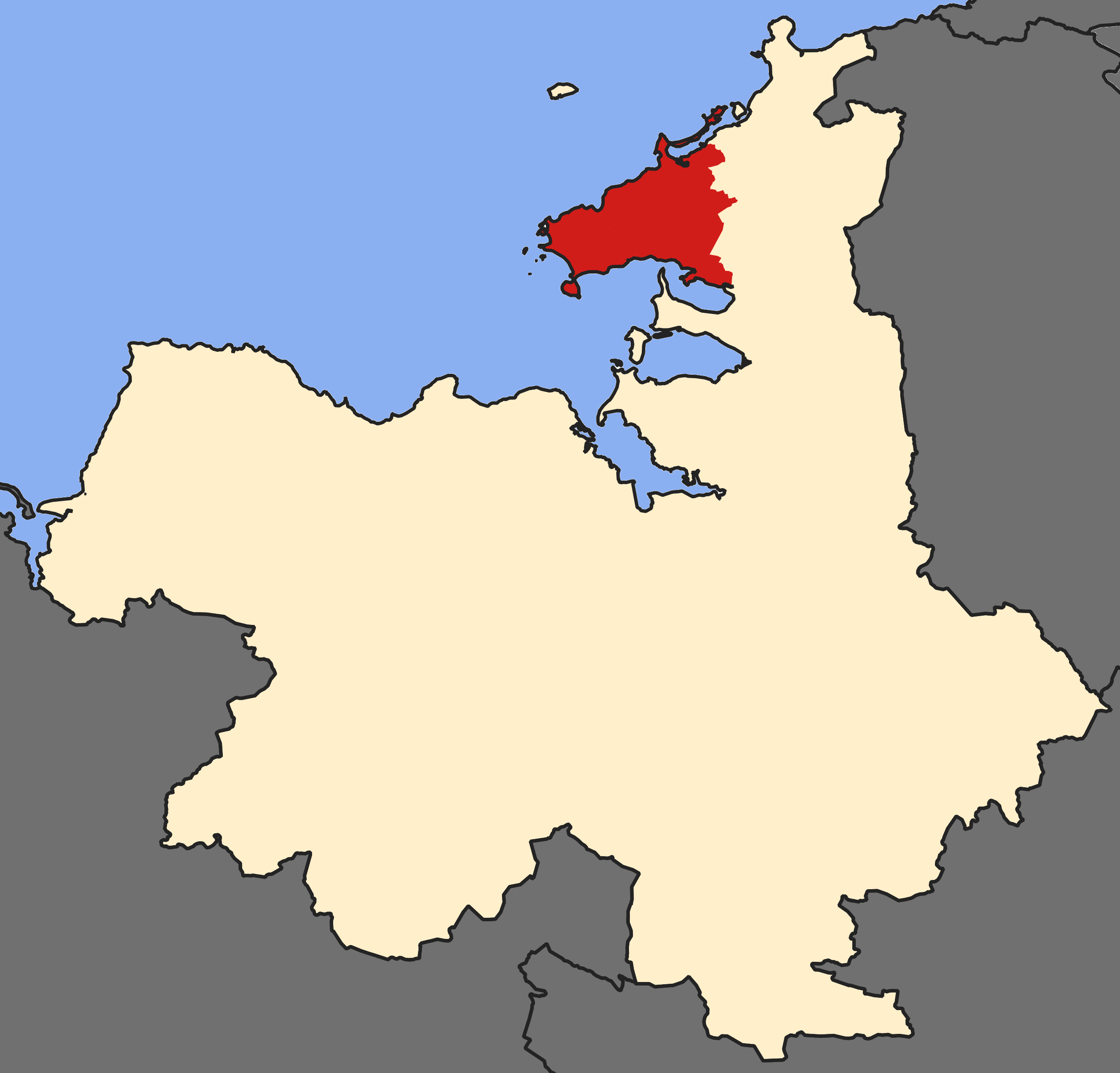
- Maugherow Peninsula (Red) within County Sligo
- Interactive map of Maugherow Peninsula

Geography
- Location: Ireland
- Adjacent to: Atlantic Ocean
- Area: 57.2 km^{2} (22.1 sq mi)

Administration
- Republic of Ireland
- County: County Sligo
- Barony: Carbury

Demographics
- Population: 3,105 (2016)
- Pop. density: 54.3/km^{2} (140.6/sq mi)

The Maugherow Peninsula (Irish: Machaire Eabha) is the largest and westernmost peninsula of County Sligo in the west of Ireland. It is also less commonly referred to as the Raghly Peninsula, after Raghly (pronounced 'Rockley') Point (Irish: Gob Reachla), which is itself a headland of the peninsula. The peninsula acts as the northern boundary of Sligo Bay.

The peninsula's rugged coastline and exposed location has made it far less popular as a tourist destination than some of Sligo's other peninsulas, such as Mullaghmore, Rosses Point and Coolera. The area is largely flat and agricultural in nature, characterised by ribbon development. Carney is the sole nucleated village on the peninsula proper, while the larger town of Grange is located on the eastern margins of the peninsula.

== Places of interest ==
- Ballygilgan Nature Reserve
- Lissadell House
- Knocklane Fort
- Raghly (pronounced 'Rockley') Harbour
- Streedagh Armada wrecksite
- Streedagh Beach
- Yellow Strand Beach

== Gallery ==
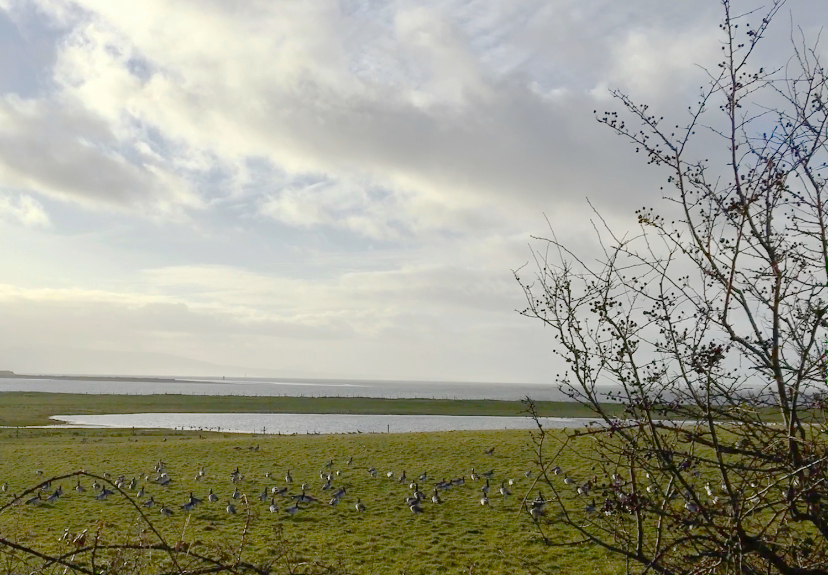
Ballygilgan

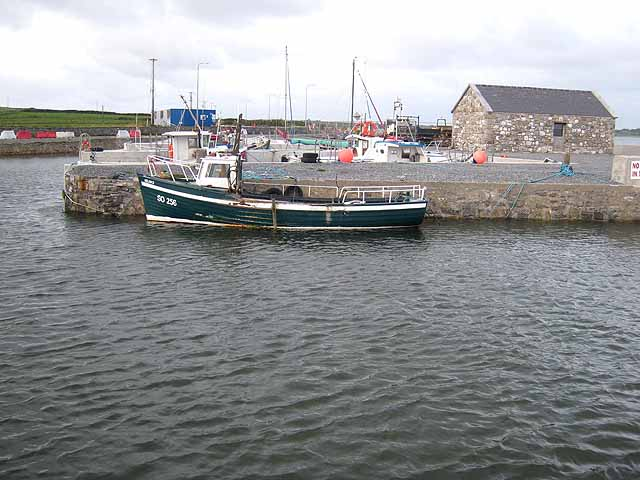
Raghly Harbour

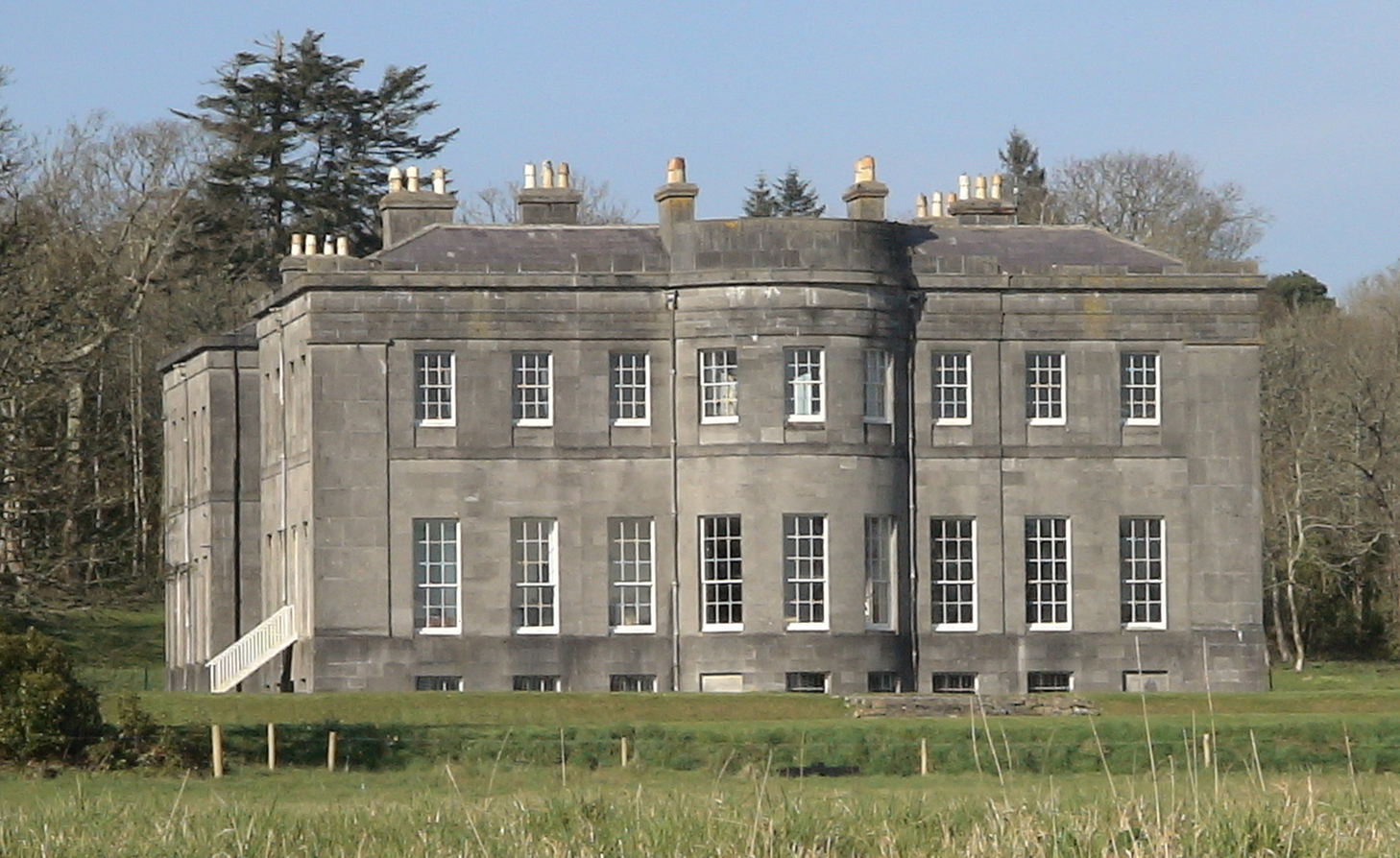
Lissadell House

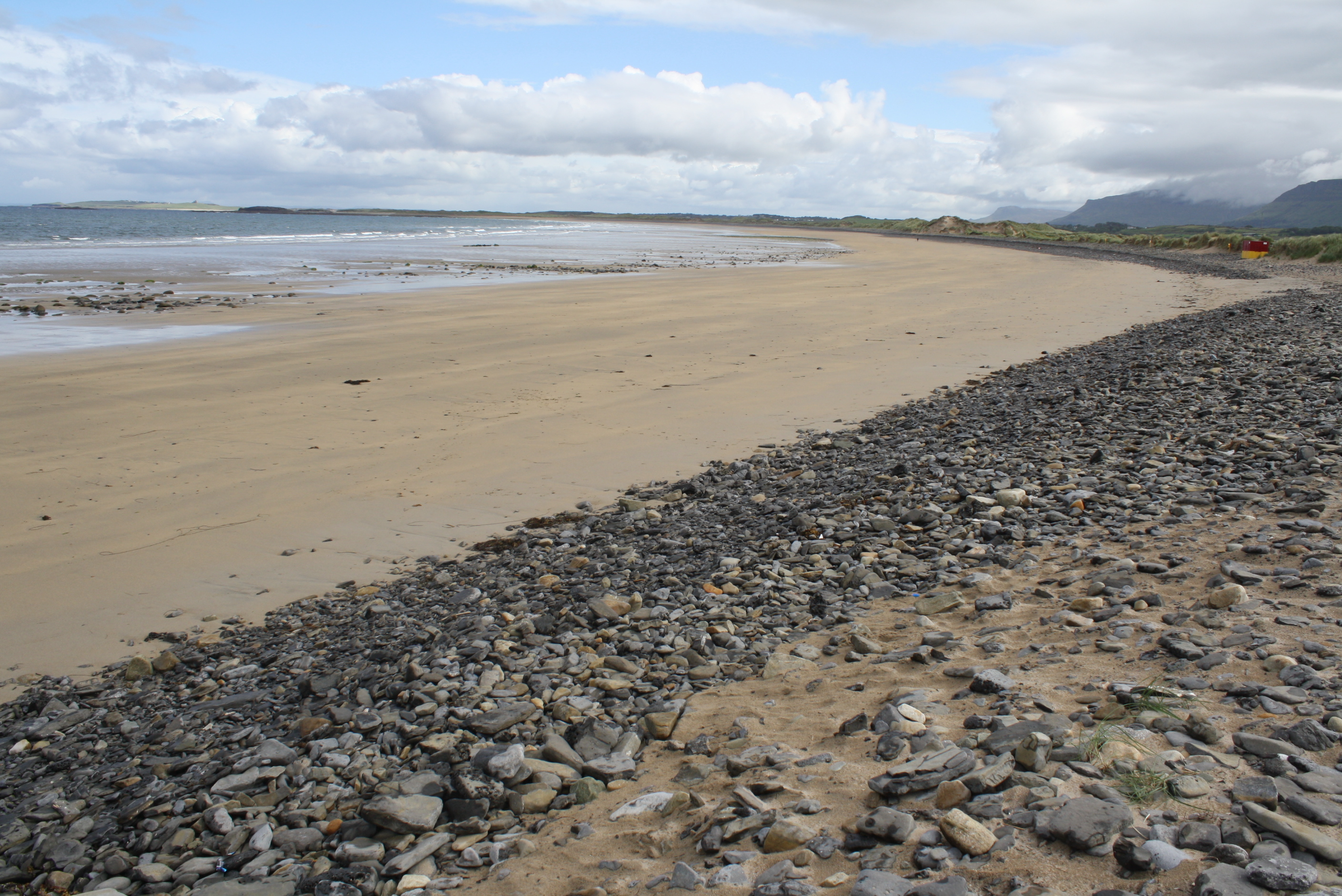
Streedagh

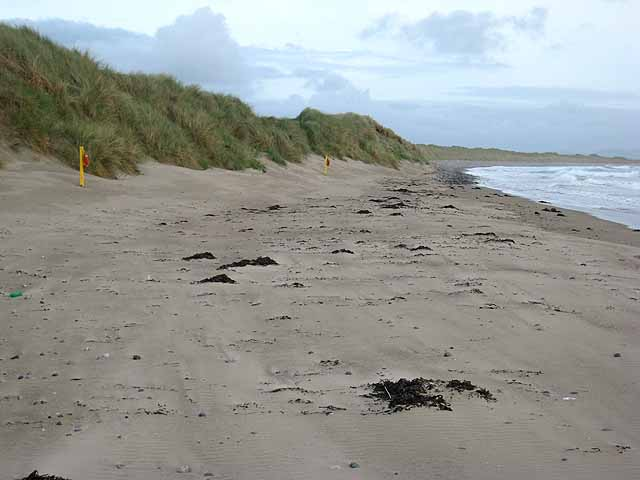
Yellow Strand

== See also ==
- Carbury, County Sligo
- Coastal landforms of Ireland
