= Coolaney =

Town in County Sligo, Ireland

Coolaney Cúil Áine
- Town
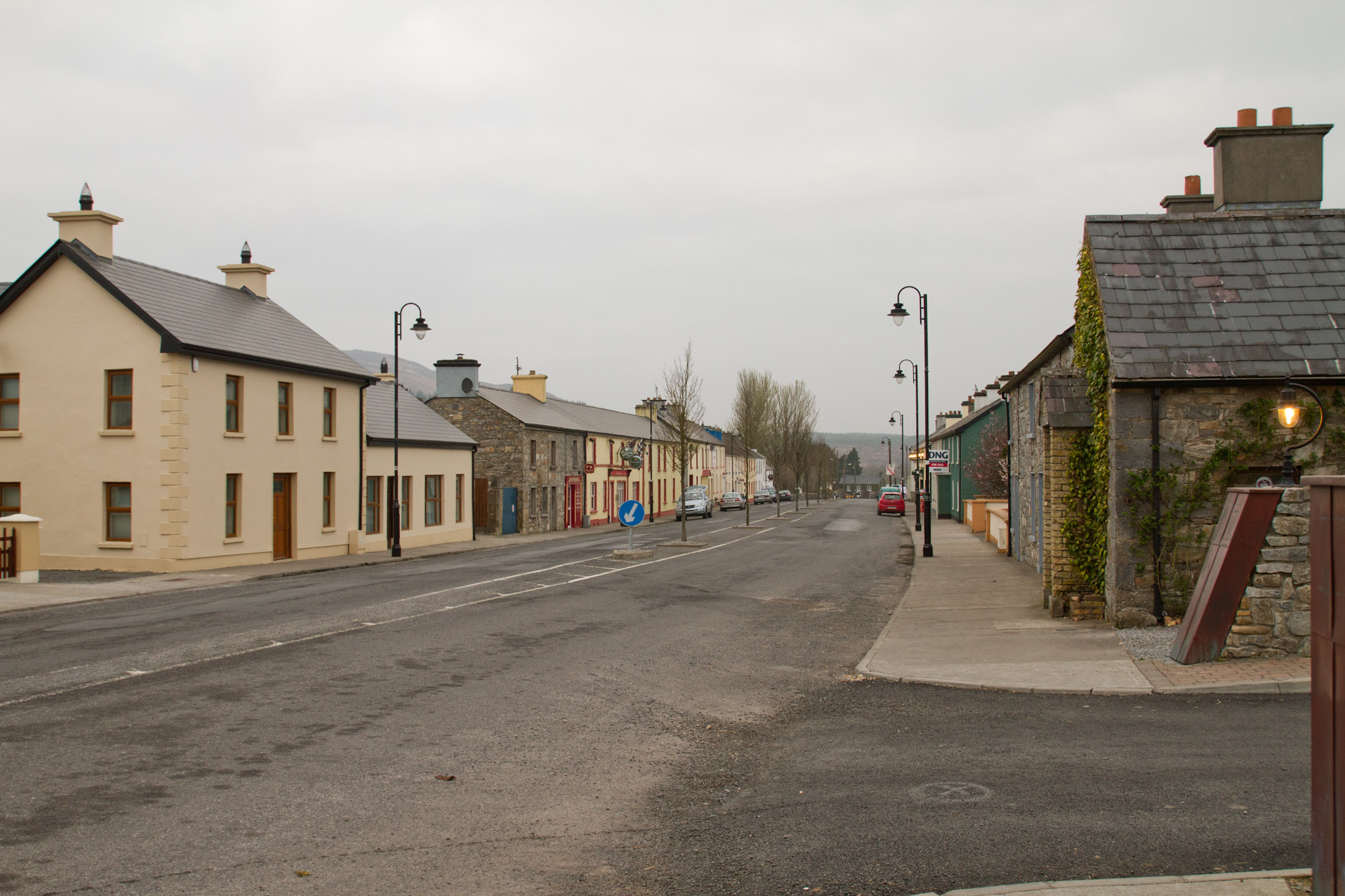
- The main street in Coolaney

- Location in Ireland
- Coordinates: 54°10′41″N 8°35′59″W
- Country: Ireland
- Province: Connacht
- County: County Sligo
- Elevation: 60 m (200 ft)

Population (2022)
  - Total: 1,155
- Time zone: UTC+0 (WET)
  - Summer (DST): UTC-1 (IST (WEST))
- Irish Grid Reference: G608256

Coolaney (Irish: Cúil Áine, meaning 'Áine's Corner') is a town in County Sligo, Ireland. Coolaney sits at the foot of the Ox Mountains with the Owenbeg river running through it, around which is a walk. The remains of an old mill are located along the riverside walk, and the remains of the sluices under the mill can still be clearly seen, as well as the outfalls into the nearby river. The village is 13 km south-west of Sligo town (18 km by road).

== Amenities ==
As of the 2022 census, Coolaney had a population of just over 1,000 people, a significant increase in the 16 years since the 2006 census, when the village had a population of just over 200 people.

Coolaney's Roman Catholic parish church is located in Rockfield, approximately 800 m from the village centre. Across from St. Joseph's Church is the national (primary) school, Rockfield National School. The village also has memorials to the 1916 Rising and to a local man who died during the Irish Civil War.

An old railway line, no longer in use, runs through the village as part of the Western Railway Corridor.

Mullagh Lough, to the northwest of Coolaney village, is used for fishing.

There is a riparian walk in Coolaney. It won the "Tidiest town in Sligo" title over 12 times. Coolaney Tidy Towns Committee was founded in 1969.

Protected structures in the area, as listed by Sligo County Council, include Leyny Station, Coolaney Bridge and Rockfield Roman Catholic Church.

Coolaney and nearby village Mullinabreena are a combined Gaelic football team.

== Gallery ==
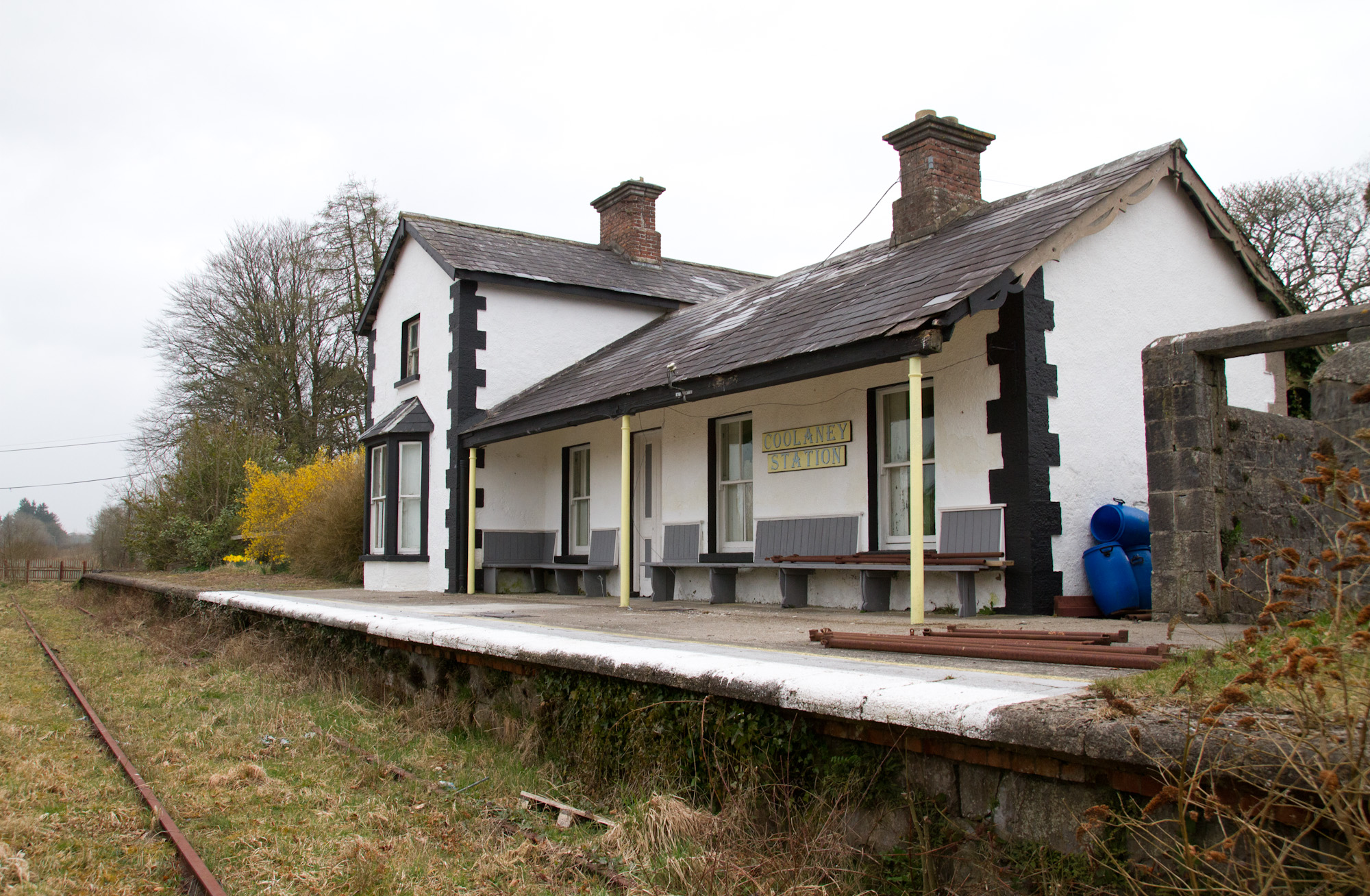
The train station at Coolaney. The line and station are no longer in use.

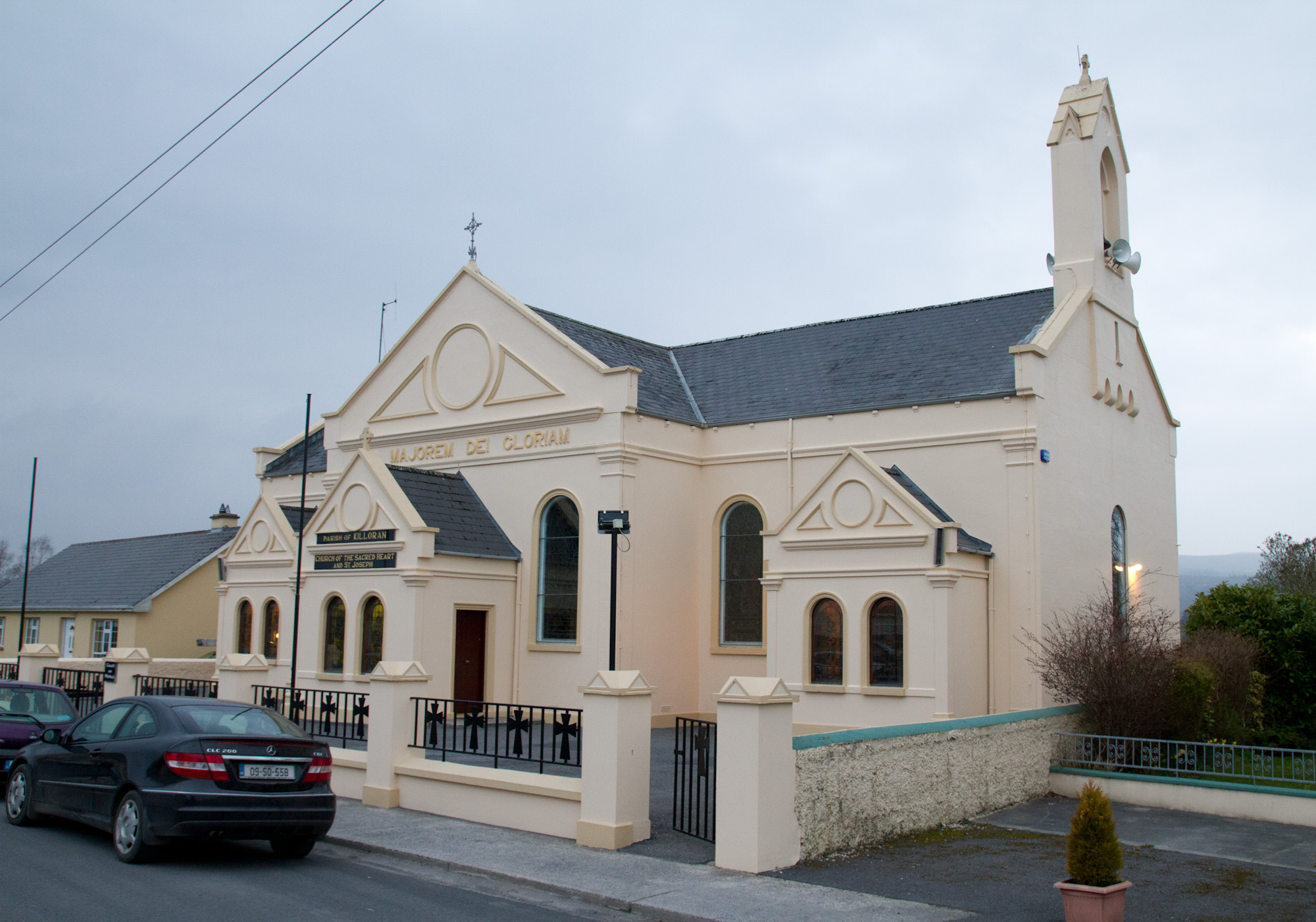
Rockfield R.C. church

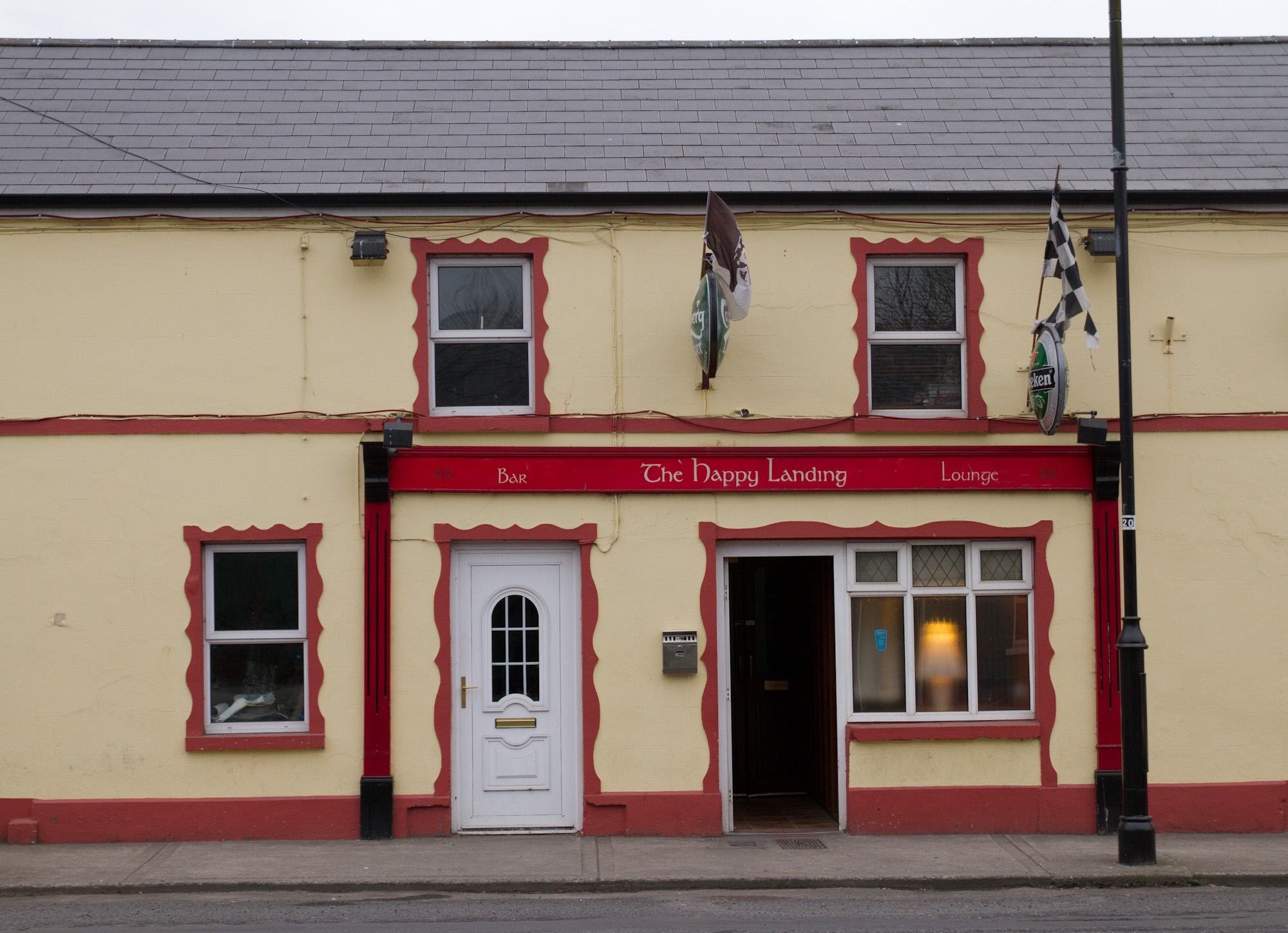
Bar in Coolaney

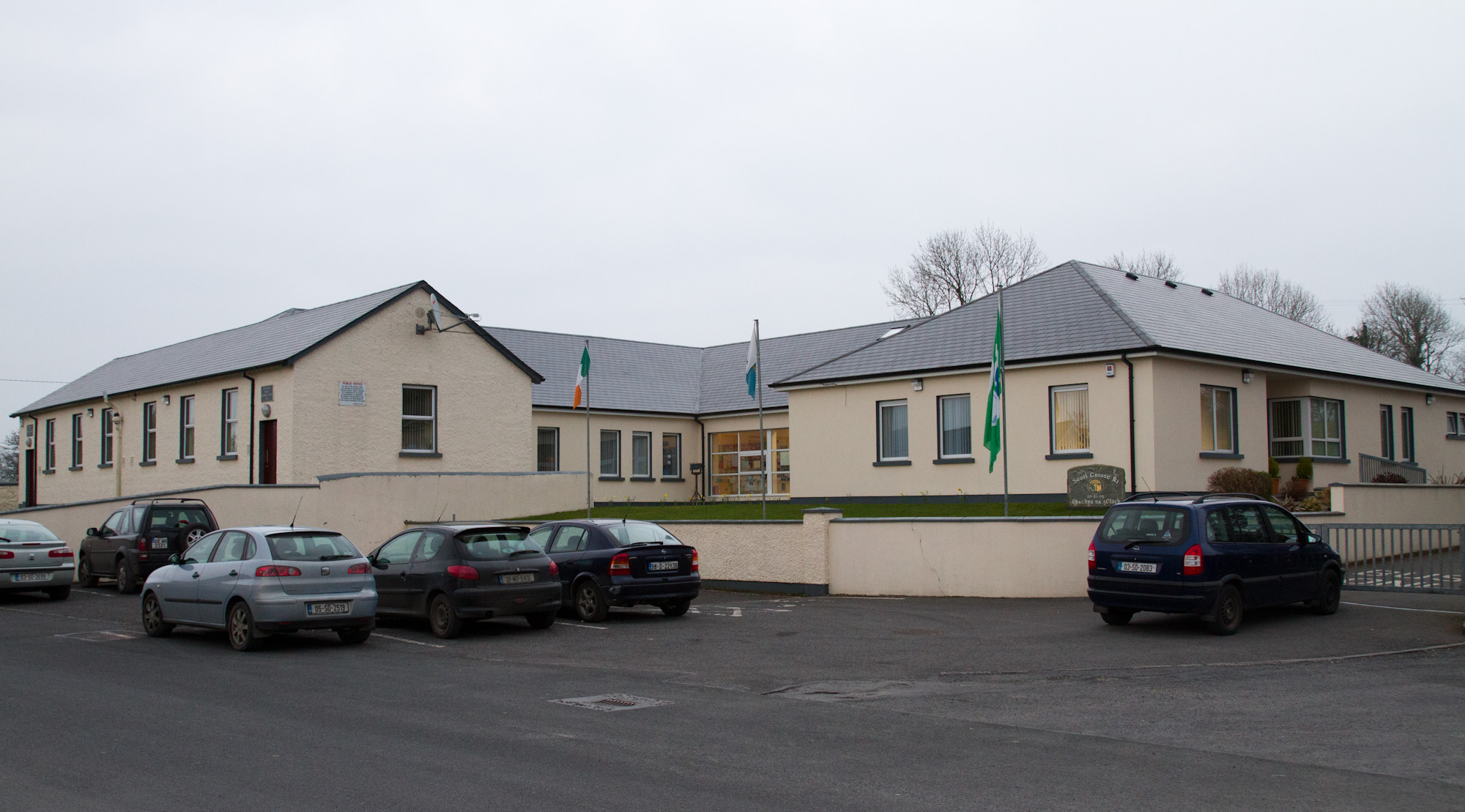
Rockfield national school.

== See also ==
- List of towns and villages in Ireland
