= Ox Mountains =

Mountain range in County Sligo, Ireland

- Sliabh Gamh
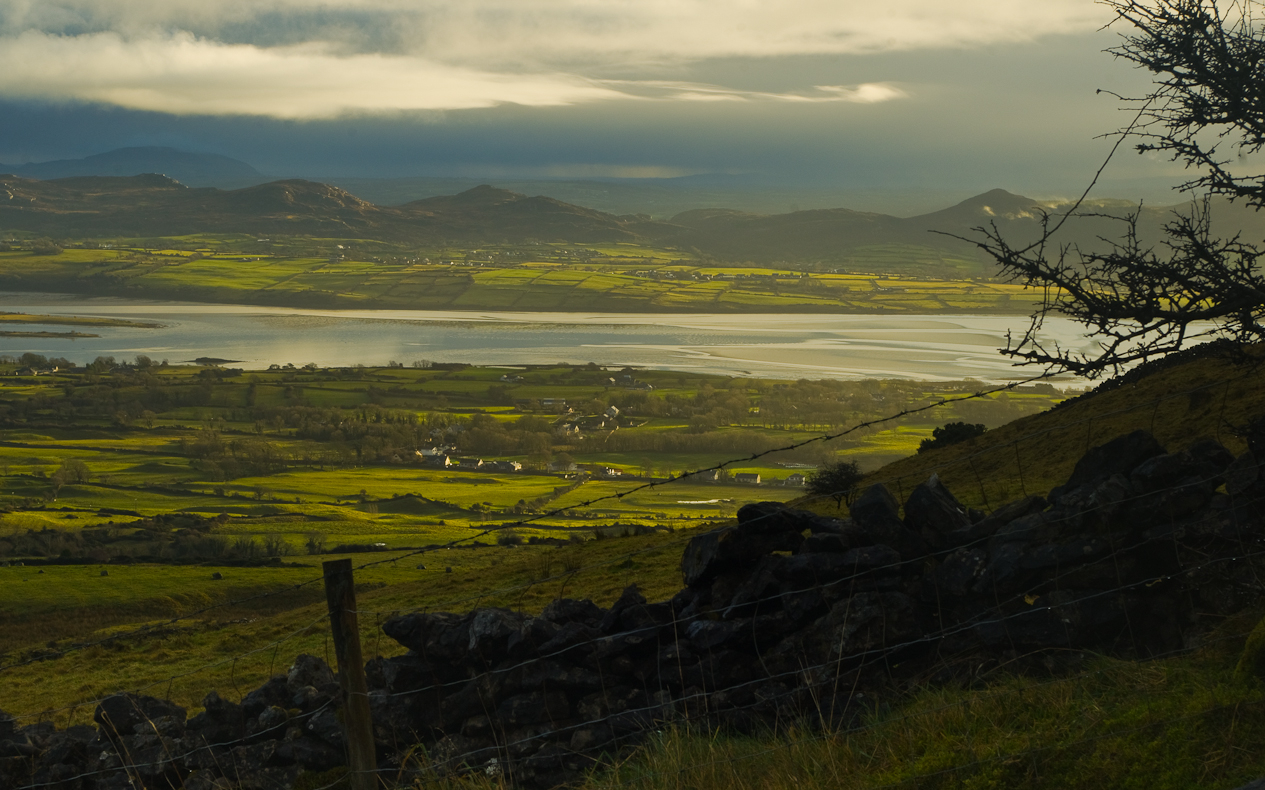
- View of the Ox Mountains from Knocknarea

Highest point
- Peak: Knockalongy
- Elevation: 544 m (1,785 ft)
- Coordinates: 54°10′N 8°50′W

Geography
- Location within island of Ireland
- Country: Ireland
- Province: Connacht

The Ox Mountains or Slieve Gamph (Irish: Sliabh Gamh, 'storm mountains') are a mountain range in County Sligo on the west coast of Ireland. They are also known as Saint Patrick's Mountains after the saint who built churches on its slopes and left his name to some of its wells.

== Geography ==
The highest peak in the Ox Mountains is Knockalongy, which is 544 metres (1,785 ft) high.

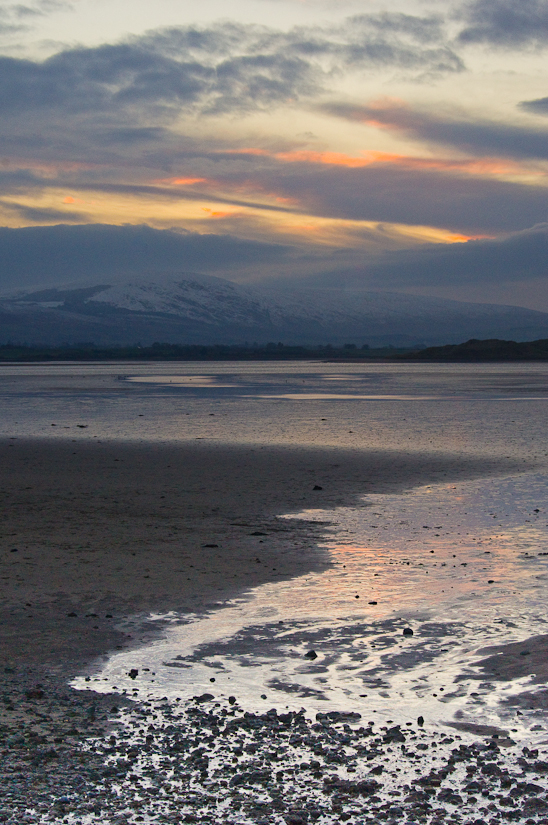
View from Culleenamore beach of Knockalongy, the range's highest peak

The mountains begin immediately southwest of Ballysadare, and run west-southwest for some forty miles to the boundary of County Mayo, where they are continued to the southwest by the Slieve Gamph range, which runs first on the boundary of the two counties, and then into Mayo. The mountains have several summits from 1,200 to 1,800 feet high; and Slieve Gamph reaches 1,363 feet.

== Geology ==
Lead and copper mines were formerly worked in the Ox Mountains, but by 1900, the works had been long since discontinued.

== Peaks ==
Hill	Height (m)
Knockalongy	544 m
Annatoran	512 m
Cloonacool	440 m
Sruffaungarve Top	400 m
Meenamaddo	330 m
Knocknashee	276 m
