= County Sligo =

County in Ireland

Coordinates: 54°15′N 8°40′W

County Sligo Contae Shligigh
- County
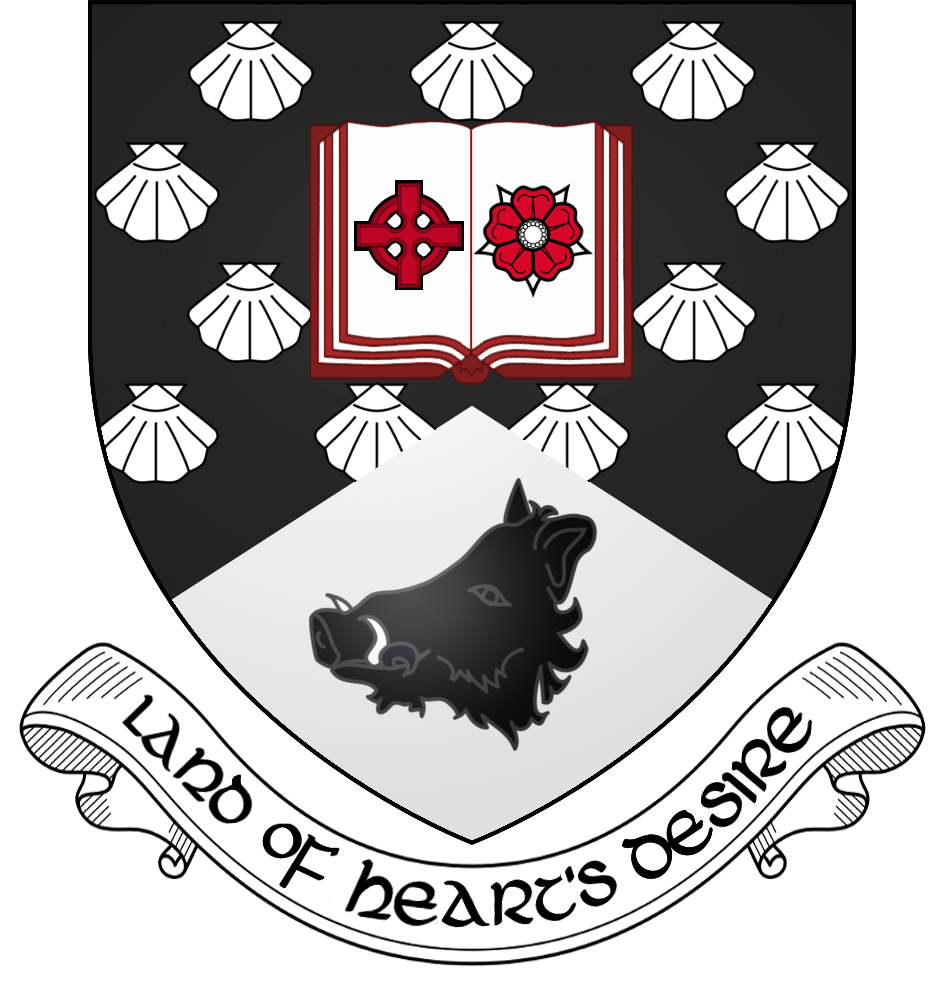
- Coat of arms
- Nickname: Yeats Country
- Motto: Land of Heart's Desire
- Anthem: "Isle of Innisfree" and "Down by the Salley Gardens"
- Interactive map of County Sligo
- Country: Ireland
- Province: Connacht
- Region: Northern and Western
- Established: 1585
- County town: Sligo

Government
  - Local authority: Sligo County Council
  - Dáil constituency: Sligo–Leitrim
  - EP constituency: Midlands–North-West

Area
  - Total: 1,838 km^{2} (710 sq mi)
  - Rank: 22nd
- Highest elevation (Truskmore): 647 m (2,123 ft)

Population (2022)
  - Total: 70,198
  - Rank: 27th
  - Density: 38.19/km^{2} (98.92/sq mi)
- Time zone: UTC±0 (WET)
  - Summer (DST): UTC+1 (IST)
- Eircode routing keys: F56, F91 (primarily)
- Telephone area codes: 071 (primarily)
- ISO 3166 code: IE-SO
- Vehicle index mark code: SO
- Website: Official website

County Sligo (/ˈslaɪɡoʊ/, Irish: Contae Shligigh) is a county in Ireland. It is in the Northern and Western Region and is part of the province of Connacht. Sligo is the administrative capital and largest town in the county. Sligo County Council is the local authority for the county. The population of the county was 70,198 at the 2022 census. It is noted for Benbulben Mountain, one of Ireland's most distinctive natural landmarks.

== History ==
The county was officially formed in 1585 by Sir Henry Sidney, Lord Deputy of Ireland, but did not come into effect until the chaos of the Nine Years' War ended, in 1603. Its boundaries reflect the Ó Conchobhair Sligigh confederation of Lower Connacht (Irish: Íochtar Connacht) as it was at the time of the Elizabethan conquest.

This confederation consisted of the tuatha, or territories, of Cairbre Drumcliabh, Tír Fhíacrach Múaidhe, Tír Ollíol, Luíghne, Corann and Cúl ó bhFionn. Under the system of surrender and regrant each tuath was subsequently made into an English barony: Carbury, Tireragh, Tirerril, Leyny, Corran and Coolavin. The capital of the newly shired county was placed at Sligo.

A causewayed enclosure discovered in 2003 at Maugheraboy is one of the earliest indications of Neolithic farming activity on the Cúil Irra Peninsula. The nearby megalithic cemetery of Carrowmore forms part of a huge complex of Stone Age remains connecting Carrowkeel in south Sligo to the Ox Mountains, to the Cuil Irra Peninsula, where the passage tomb named after the legendary Queen Maeve, Miosgán Médhbh, dominates the western skyline from the crest of Knocknarea Mountain.

The Caves of Kesh, famous in Irish mythology, are in south County Sligo. A recent decoding of the work of Marinus of Tyre and Ptolemy shows Sligo as the likely location of Nagnata, an important place of assembly in the Iron Age. Famous medieval manuscripts written in the area include the Book of Ballymote, written in the territory of Corran, the Great Book of Lecan, and the Yellow Book of Lecan, both written in Tir Fhiacrach. The patron of the Annals of the Four Masters was Fearghal Ó Gadhra of Coolavin in south County Sligo.

== Local government and politics ==
The island of Ireland, showing location of County Sligo.

Sligo County Council is the local authority for the county. At the 2019 Sligo County Council election, it was divided into three local electoral areas (LEAs): Ballymote–Tobercurry (7 seats), Sligo–Strandhill (6 seats), and Sligo–Drumcliff (5 seats). Each of these form a municipal district, with the containing Sligo–Strandhill known as the borough district of Sligo.

=== Former districts ===
Under the Local Government (Ireland) Act 1898, County Sligo was divided into the rural districts of Boyle No. 2, Dromore West, Sligo, and Tobercurry, and the urban district of Sligo. Unlike most urban districts, Sligo had retained its borough corporation. The rural districts were abolished in 1925. Sligo Borough Corporation became a borough council in 2002, before being abolished in 2014 in common with all borough and town councils in Ireland.

=== National politics ===
County Sligo is part of the Dáil constituency of Sligo–Leitrim (4 TDs). At the 2020 election, Martin Kenny (Sinn Féin), Frank Feighan (Fine Gael), Marc MacSharry (Fianna Fáil) and Marian Harkin (Ind) were elected.

=== Coat of arms ===
This coat of arms was adopted by Sligo County Council in 1980. The design on the black shield, which shows an open book on which there is a Celtic Cross and a red rose, represents collectively the literary and cultural history of Sligo. These refer to such early works as the Books of Ballymote and Lecan, while the rose was a significant theme in the poetry of W. B. Yeats. The escallop shells sprinkled on the shield refer to the origin of the word Sligeach – "a place abounding in shells". The boar's head refers to the "wild boar of Benbulben" in the Diarmuid and Gráinne myth. The colour scheme of the crest incorporates the Sligo GAA colours of black and white.

== Culture ==
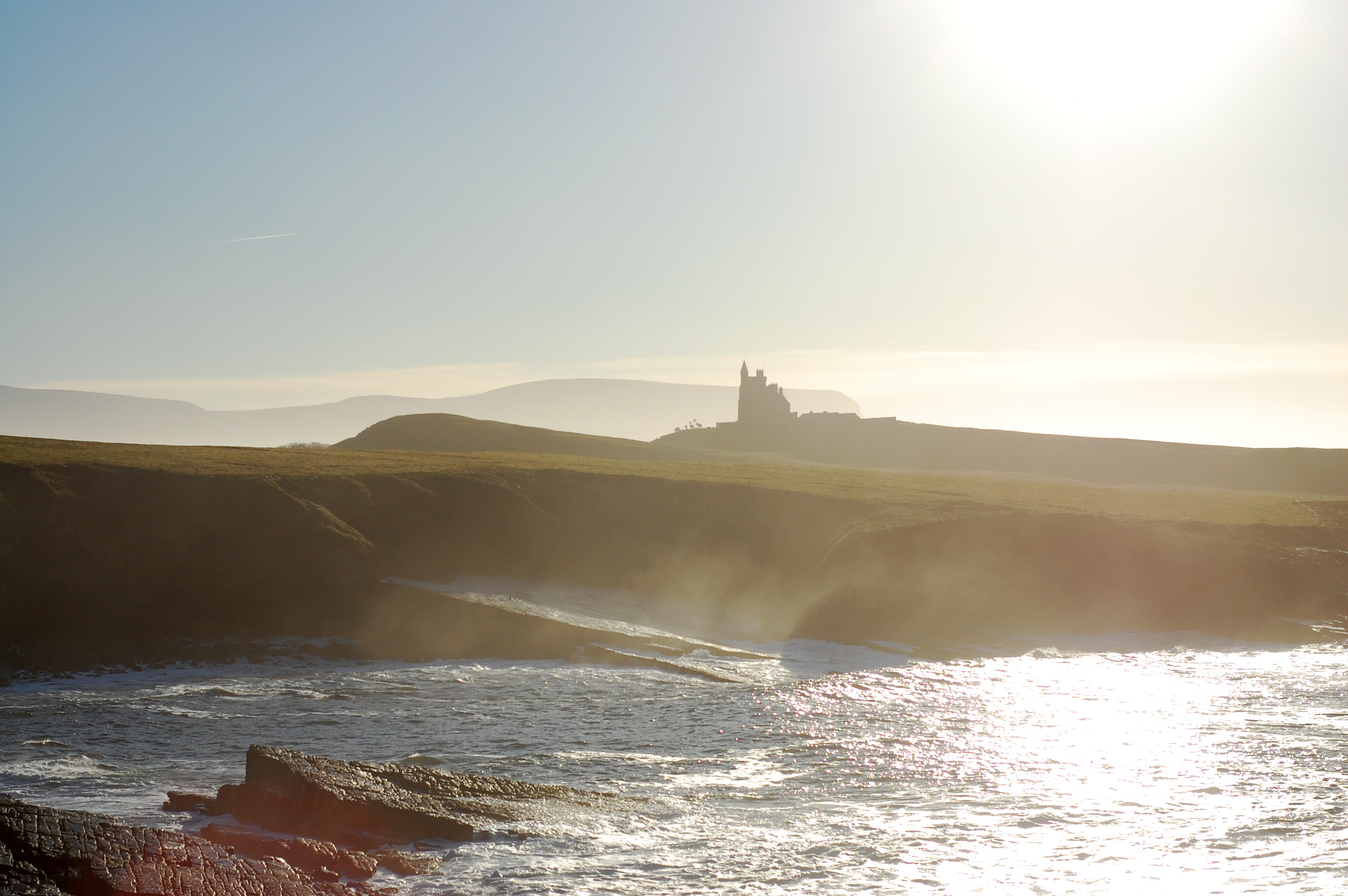
The Sligo coastline at Mullaghmore, with Classiebawn Castle in the distance

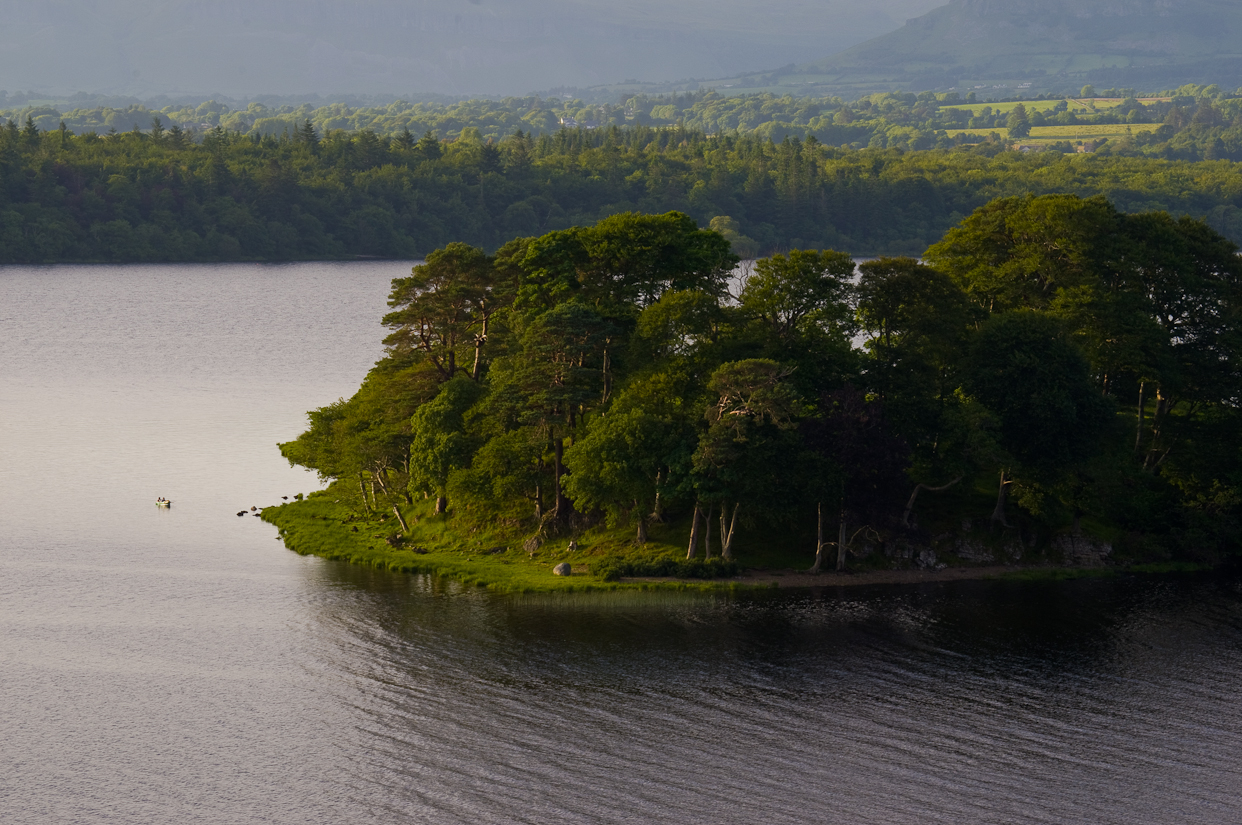
Beezie's Island on Lough Gill

County Sligo is the setting for a large number of the texts in the Mythological Cycles. The story of Diarmad and Grainne has its final act played out on Ben Bulben. The Second Battle of Moytirra is associated with Moytirra in South County Sligo. Other texts include Bruidean Ceise Corann, set on Keash Mountain. The rich array of megalithic monuments in the area has been an inspiration to artists and writers such as Sir Samuel Ferguson. The poet and Nobel laureate W. B. Yeats (1865–1939) spent much of his childhood in northern Sligo and the county's landscapes (particularly the Isle of Innisfree, in Lough Gill) were the inspiration for much of his poetry. Yeats said, "the place that has really influenced my life most is Sligo". He is buried in North County Sligo, "Under Ben Bulben", in Drumcliff. W. B. Yeats's brother Jack, a painter, also was inspired by the Sligo landscape.

=== Music ===
County Sligo has a long history of traditional music. The south of the county is particularly noted with such musical luminaries as James Morrison, Michael Coleman, Paddy Killoran, Fred Finn, Peter Horan, Joe O'Dowd, Jim Donoghue, Martin Wynne, Oisín Mac Diarmada (of Téada), tin-whistle player Carmel Gunning and the band Dervish. The county has many traditional music festivals. One of the most well-known is the Queen Maeve International Summer School, a traditional Irish Music summer school of music and dance which is held annually in August in Sligo Town. On the more contemporary music scene there are Westlife, Tabby Callaghan and The Conway Sisters who are from Sligo. Strandhill, about 9 km west of Sligo, hosts the Strandhill Guitar Festival each year, featuring a wide variety of guitar music and musicians.

=== Sport ===
The county is home to League of Ireland Premier Division club Sligo Rovers, who have played home matches at The Showgrounds since they were founded in 1928 and won the league on 3 occasions. Their colours are red and white, hence their nickname the Bit 'O' Red. Brother Walfrid, the founder of Celtic Football Club, was born in Ballymote, in the south of the county.

The county is represented in Gaelic Games by Sligo GAA. Their colours are black and white. Sligo has won the Connacht Championship 3 times.

== Geography and subdivisions ==
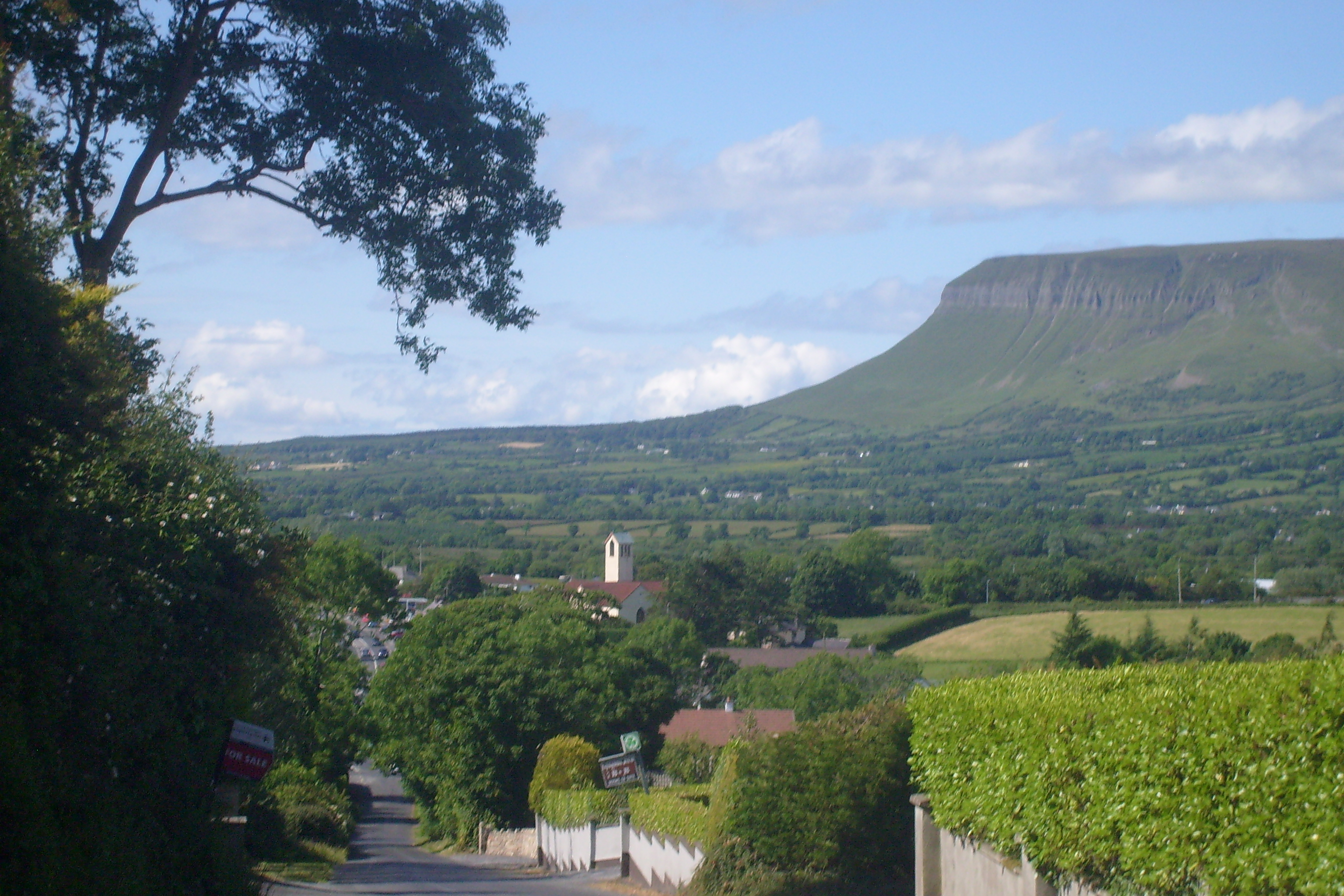
Sligo countryside and Ben Bulben seen in the background

Sligo is the 22nd largest of Ireland's 32 counties in area, and the 27th largest in terms of population. It is the fourth largest of Connacht's 5 counties in size and third largest in terms of population. The County borders County Mayo to the west, County Roscommon to the south and south-east and County Leitrim to the northeast.

=== Largest towns in County Sligo (2022 Census) ===
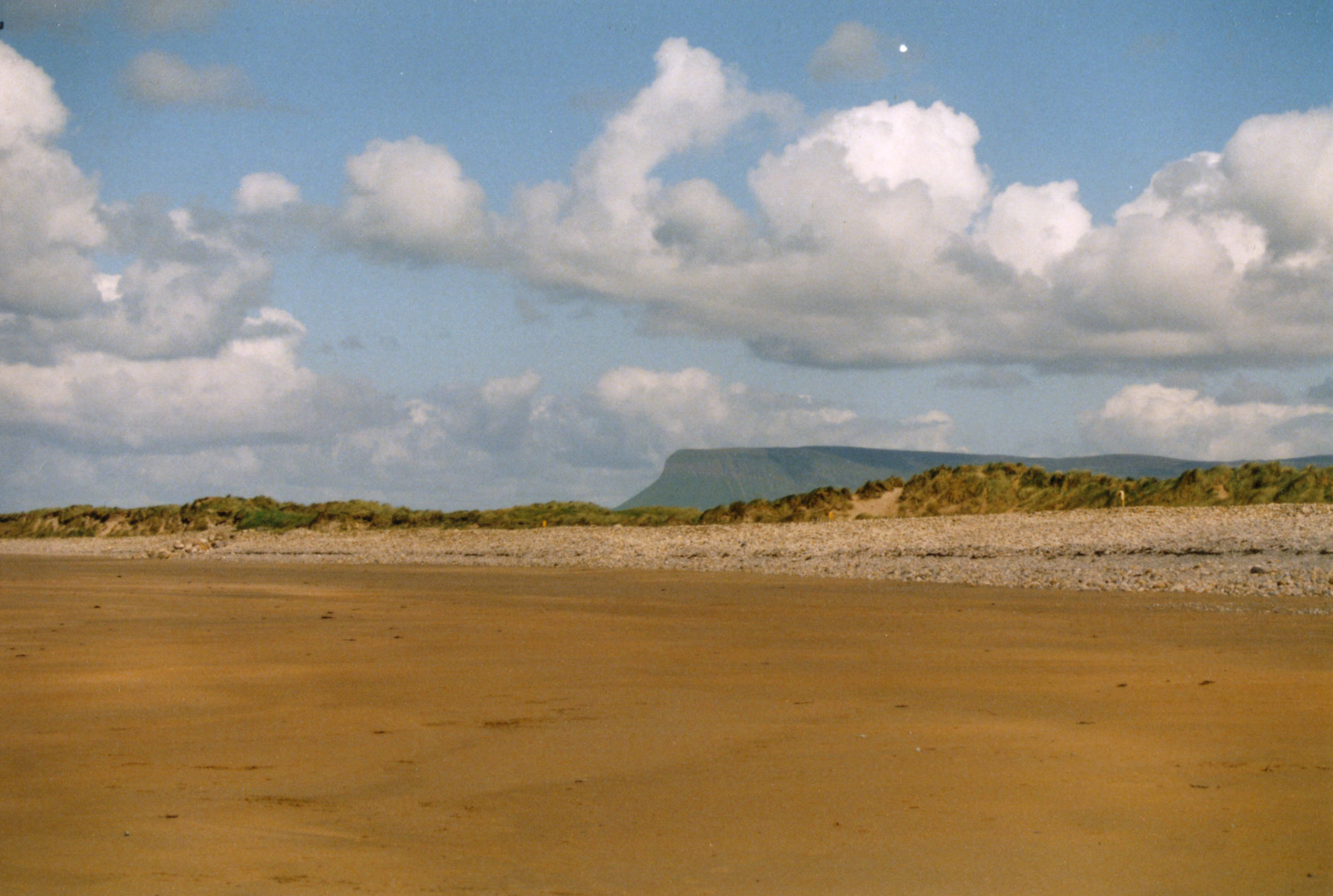
Beach near Strandhill

1. Sligo, 20,608
2. Tubbercurry, 2,307
3. Strandhill, 1,982
4. Collooney, 1,797
5. Ballysadare, 1,747
6. Ballymote, 1,711
7. Enniscrone, 1,291
8. Bellaghy*, 1,172 (includes Charlestown, County Mayo)
9. Coolaney, 1,155
10. Rosses Point, 883

=== Towns and villages ===
- Achonry
- Aclare
- Ballaghnatrillick
- Ballinafad
- Ballygawley
- Ballintogher
- Ballymote
- Ballynacarrow
- Ballysadare
- Bellaghy
- Beltra
- Bunninadden
- Carney
- Castlebaldwin
- Cliffony
- Cloonacool
- Collooney
- Coolaney
- Dromore West
- Drumcliff
- Easky
- Enniscrone
- Geevagh
- Grange
- Gorteen
- Kilglass
- Monasteraden
- Mullaghmore
- Riverstown
- Rosses Point
- Skreen
- Strandhill
- Toorlestraun
- Tubbercurry

== Places of interest ==
- Benbulbin
- Carrowkeel Megalithic Cemetery
- Carrowmore Megalithic Cemetery
- Caves of Kesh
- Coolera Peninsula
- Curlew Mountains
- Dartry Mountains
- Easkey Bog
- Glencar Lough
- Knocknarea
- Lough Arrow
- Lough Gill
- Maugherow Peninsula
- Mullaghmore Peninsula
- Ox Mountains
- Rosses Point Peninsula
- Sligo Abbey
- Sruth in Aghaidh an Aird

== Notable people ==
- Feldmarschall The 3rd Earl of Carlingford (1639–1704) - senior military commander for the Habsburg monarchy in the Holy Roman Empire. Lord Carlingford was born in Ballymote, and he later served as the chief minister of the Duchy of Lorraine.
- Michael Coleman (1891–1945) – traditional musician
- Owen Connellan (1797–1871) – Irish Scholar, translated the Annals of the Four Masters in 1846
- Michael Corcoran (1827–1863) – Union Army general in the American Civil War
- Adrienne Cullen (1960–2018) – journalist, editor and healthcare campaigner
- Kian Egan (born 1980) – member of the pop band Westlife
- Mark Feehily (born 1980) – member of Westlife
- Shane Filan (born 1979) – member of Westlife
- Tommy Fleming (born 1971) – singer
- Scott Fredericks (1943–2017) – actor
- Marian Harkin (born 1953) – Teachta Dála (TD) for Sligo–Leitrim; previously a Member of the European Parliament (MEP) from 2004 to 2019
- Neil Jordan (born 1950) – film director, screenwriter, novelist and short-story writer
- Constance Markievicz (1868–1927) – revolutionary Irish nationalist, the first woman elected to the British Parliament
- Pauline McLynn (born 1962) – actress; Mrs Doyle in the sitcom Father Ted
- Ray McSharry (born 1938) – Fianna Fáil Teachta Dála (TD) for Sligo–Leitrim from 1969 to 1988; Tánaiste. He also served as Member of the European Parliament (MEP) for the Connacht–Ulster constituency
- Martin Moffat (1882–1946) – soldier, recipient of the Victoria Cross
- Lola Montez (1821–1861) – dancer, actress
- James Morrison (1893–1947) – traditional musician
- Christopher O'Donnell (born 1998) – Olympic track and field athlete
- Nace O'Dowd (1931–1987) – Gaelic football captain for the Sligo county team
- Mary O'Hara (born 1935) – singer
- Ambrosio O'Higgins, 1st Marquis of Osorno (1720–1801) – Spanish colonial administrator
- Martin Savage (1897–1919) – Irish Republican
- Sir George Stokes (1819–1903) – mathematician, physicist
- Brother Walfrid (1840–1915) – founder of Celtic FC
- Jack Butler Yeats (1871–1957) – artist
- W. B. Yeats (1865–1939) – poet

== Railways ==
The Dublin–Sligo railway line is operated by Iarnród Éireann in Ireland. It starts in Dublin Connolly station, terminating at Sligo Mac Diarmada railway station in Sligo. In the county there are stations at Ballymote and Collooney.

== See also ==
Historical population
Year	Pop.	±%
1600	1,095	—
1610	3,945	+260.3%
1653	4,001	+1.4%
1659	6,877	+71.9%
1821	146,229	+2026.3%
1831	171,765	+17.5%
1841	180,886	+5.3%
1851	128,515	−29.0%
1861	124,845	−2.9%
1871	115,493	−7.5%
1881	111,578	−3.4%
1891	98,013	−12.2%
1901	84,083	−14.2%
1911	79,045	−6.0%
1926	71,388	−9.7%
1936	67,447	−5.5%
1946	62,375	−7.5%
1951	60,513	−3.0%
1956	56,850	−6.1%
1961	53,561	−5.8%
1966	51,263	−4.3%
1971	50,275	−1.9%
1979	54,610	+8.6%
1981	55,474	+1.6%
1986	56,046	+1.0%
1991	54,756	−2.3%
1996	55,821	+1.9%
2002	58,200	+4.3%
2006	60,894	+4.6%
2011	65,393	+7.4%
2016	65,535	+0.2%
2022	70,198	+7.1%

- High Sheriff of Sligo
- List of abbeys and priories in the Republic of Ireland (County Sligo)
- List of people from Sligo
- Sligo GAA
- Sligo Rovers F.C.
- Sligo (Town)
- Wild Atlantic Way
