= Wild Atlantic Way =

Irish coastal 2,500 km road route

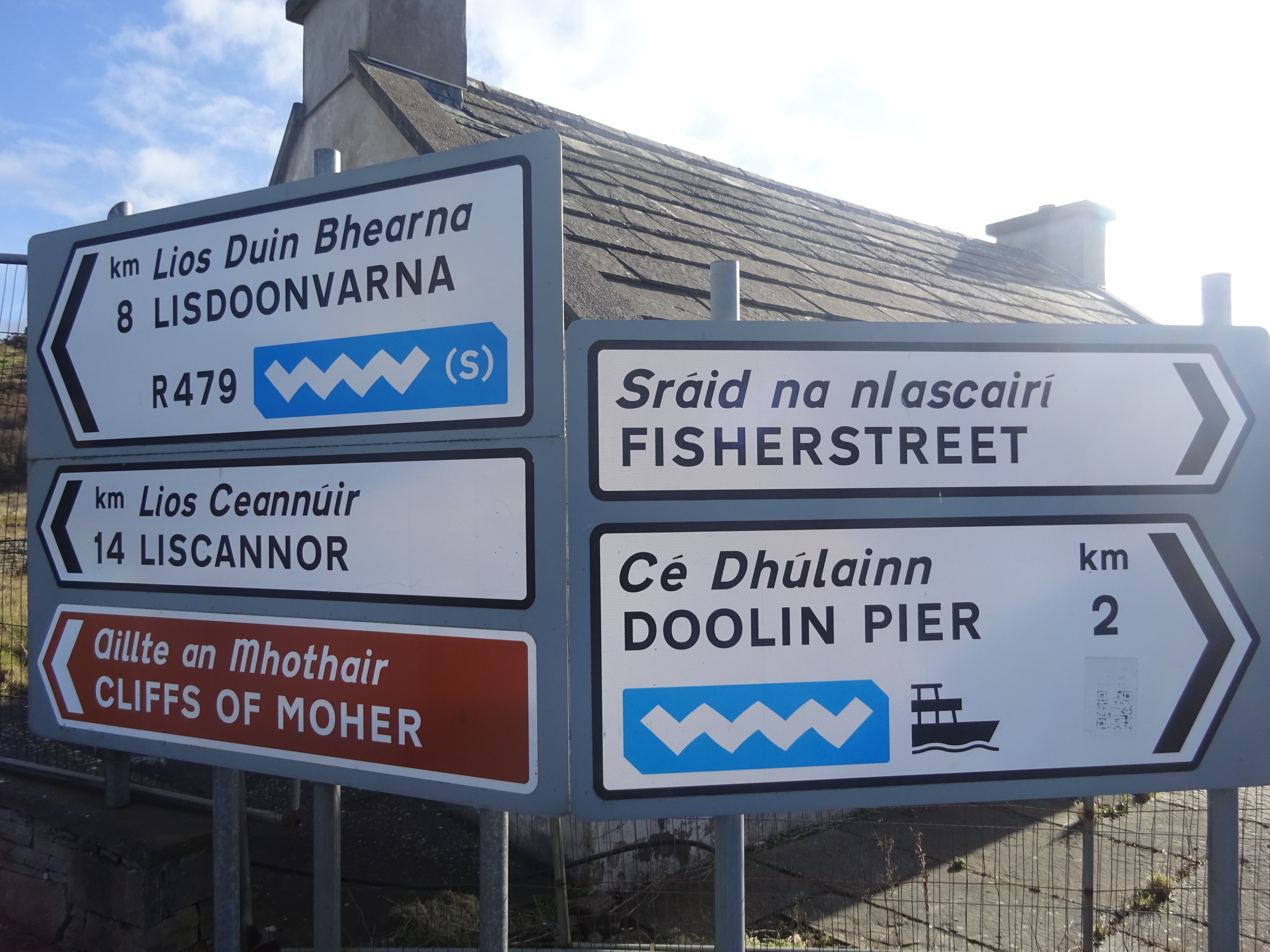
Wild Atlantic Way road signs in County Clare

The Wild Atlantic Way (Irish: Slí an Atlantaigh Fhiáin) is a tourism trail on the west coast, and on parts of the north and south coasts, of Ireland. The 2,500 km (1,553 mile) driving route passes through nine counties and three provinces, stretching from County Donegal's Inishowen Peninsula in Ulster to Kinsale, County Cork, in Munster, on the Celtic Sea coast.

== Description ==
Signature Discovery Point

Some of the most popular attractions along the Wild Atlantic Way include the Cliffs of Moher, the Skelligs Viewpoint, the Dingle Peninsula, the Old Head of Kinsale, and Downpatrick Head.

The route is broken down into five sections:

- County Donegal
- County Donegal to County Mayo
- County Mayo to County Clare
- County Clare to County Kerry
- County Kerry to County Cork

Along the route, there are 157 discovery points, 1,000 attractions and more than 2,500 activities.

The route was officially launched in 2014 by the Minister of State for Tourism and Sport, Michael Ring, T.D.

== Key points of interest ==
=== North West – Donegal, Leitrim and Sligo ===
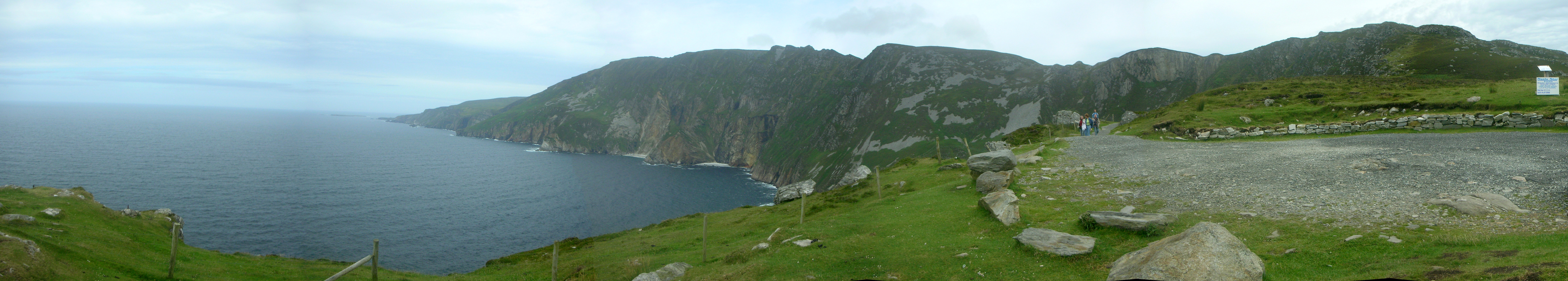
Slieve League, on the south-west coast of County Donegal in Ulster

- Malin Head, Ireland’s most northerly point
- Lough Foyle
- Lough Swilly
- Isle of Doagh
- Carrickabraghy Castle
- Shrove
- Fort Dunree
- Buncrana
- Grianán of Aileach (Greenan Fort)
- Ramelton
- Rathmullan
- Fanad
- Rosguill
- Doe Castle
- Derryveagh Mountains
- Horn Head
- Tory Island
- Árainn Mhór (Arranmore Island)
- Gaoth Dobhair
- The Rosses
- Errigal
- Malin Beg beach
- Slieve League cliffs
- Largy Waterfall (also known as 'South Donegal's Secret Waterfall')
- Blue Stack Mountains
- Donegal Town
- Bundoran – popular with surfers
- Tullaghan
- Mullaghmore Head
- Spanish Armada shipwrecks at Streedagh Beach
- Rosses Point Peninsula
- Aughris
- Easky
- Enniscrone

=== West – Mayo and Galway ===
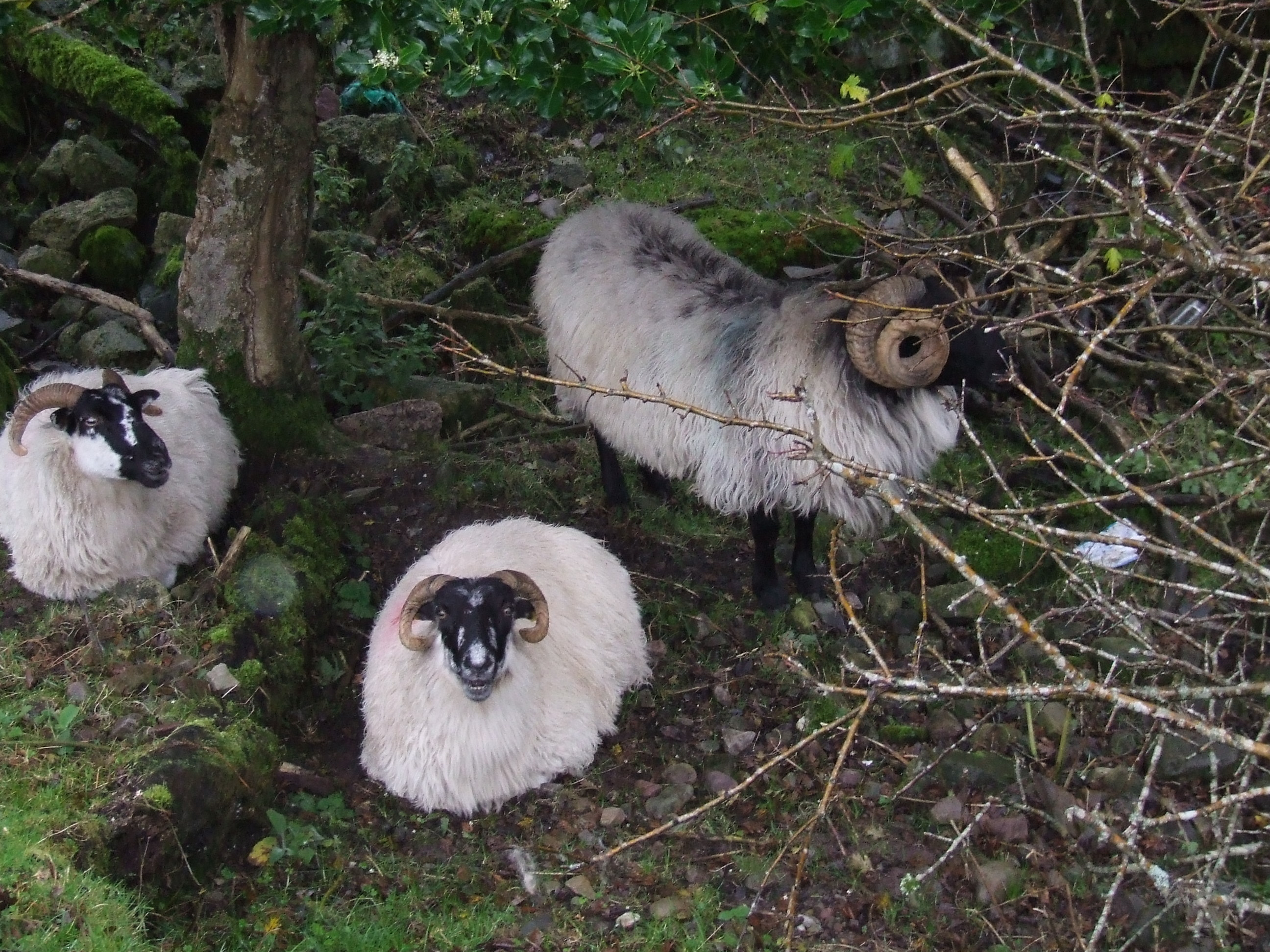
Sheep in a paddock by the Great Western Greenway near Mulranny. November 2014

- The Céide Fields
- The Mullet Peninsula
- Achill Island
- Clew Bay
- Croagh Patrick
- Clare Island
- Inishturk – accessible by ferry from Louisburgh, County Mayo
- Doolough
- Killary Harbour
- Connemara
- Clifden
- Inishbofin – accessible by ferry from Cleggan, County Galway
- Oileáin Árann (Aran Islands) – accessible by ferry from Rossaveal County Galway and Doolin County Clare.

=== Mid West – Clare and Limerick ===
- The Burren
- The Cliffs of Moher the Doolin Cliff Walk and the Liscannor Walk.
- Loop Head
- The Shannon Estuary and the Shannon dolphins

=== South West – Kerry and Cork ===
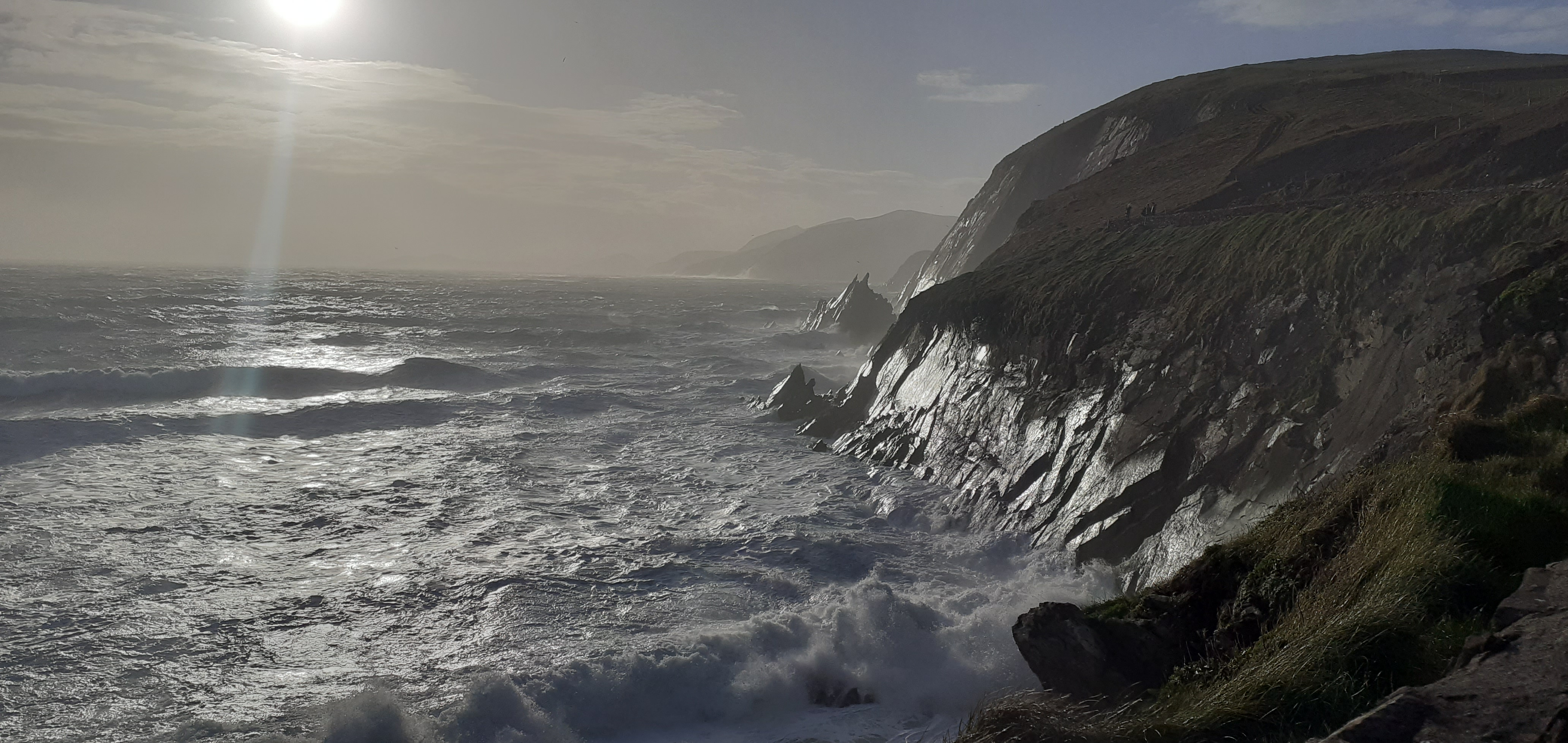
Cliffs in West County Kerry

- Allihies and the Allihies Copper Mine Museum on the Beara Peninsula
- Bere Island
- Cape Clear
- Caherdaniel
- Derrynane beach
- Mountain Stage Viewpoint, Kerry Mountain
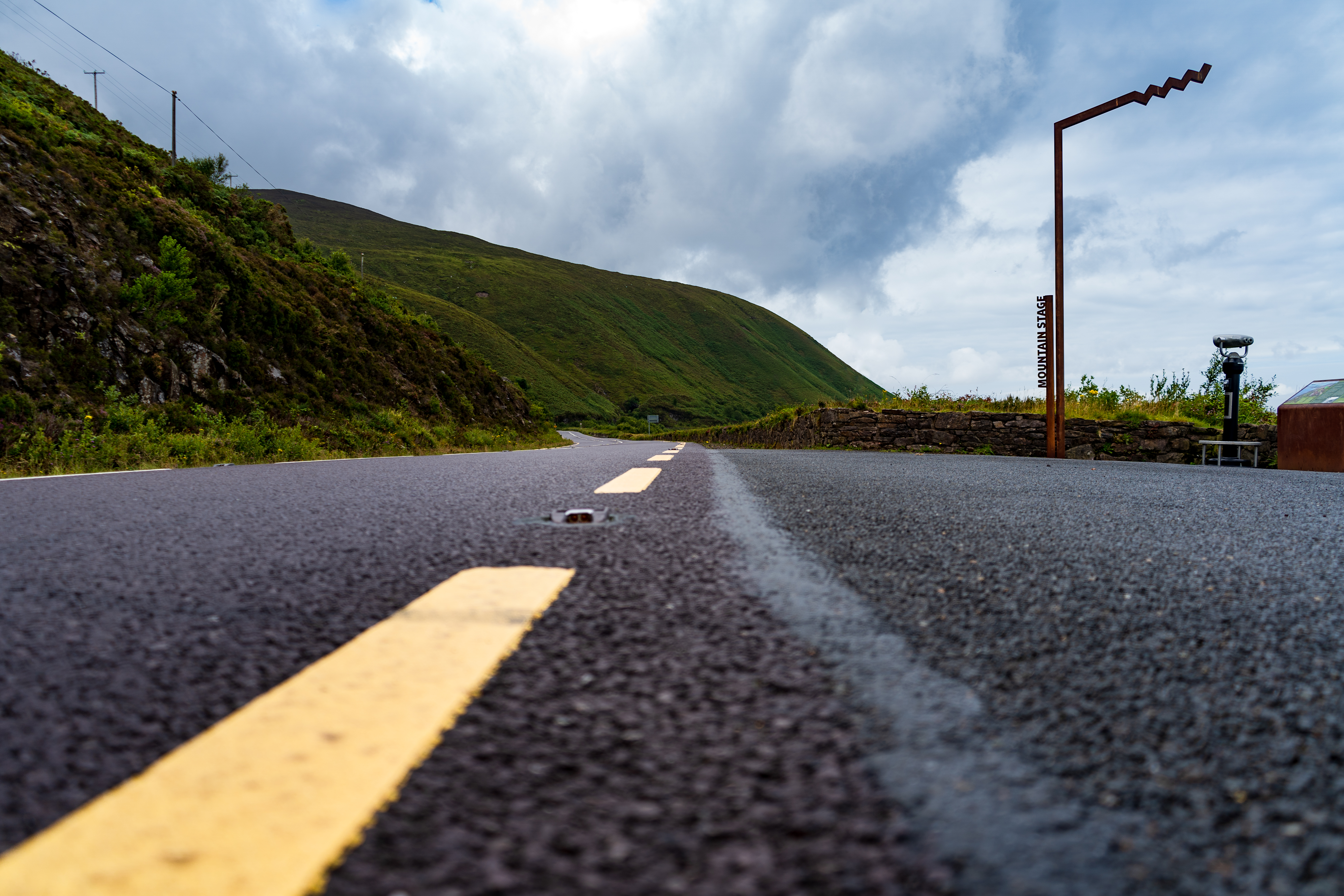
  Mountain Stage Viewpoint, Kerry Mountain
- Garnish Island in Glengarriff
- The ruined cottages of Great Blasket Island, and the Blasket Centre in Dunquin
- Mount Brandon
- Ballyheigue Beach, blue flag beach
- Dingle, Ireland's largest Gaeltacht town
- Rossbeigh beach

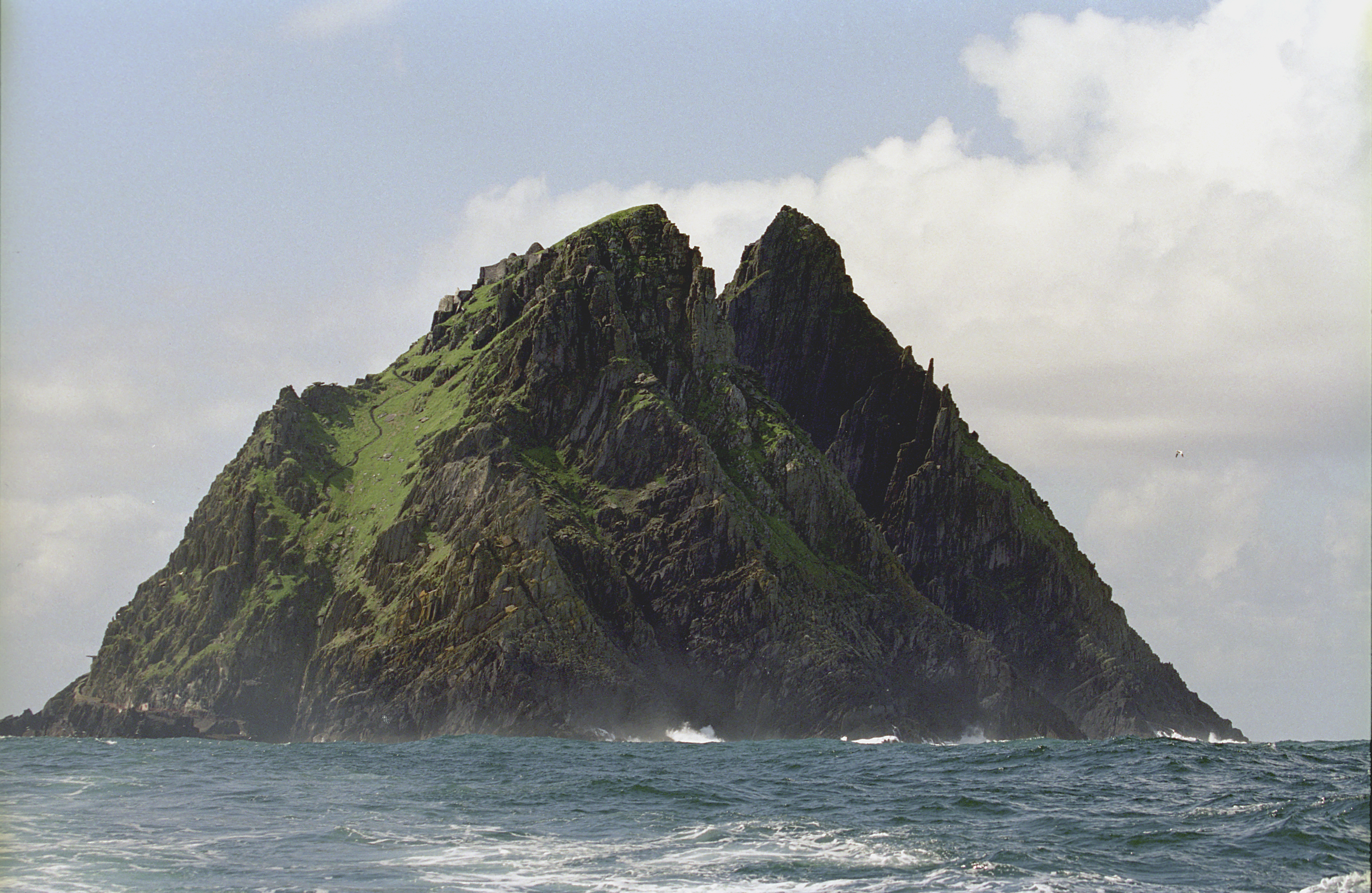
View of Skellig Michael, off the coast of south County Kerry

- The Skellig Experience Visitor Centre
- Dursey Island – accessible by Ireland’s only cable car
- Heir Island
- Long Island
- Sheep's Head – the Sheep's Head peninsula is home to the Sheep's Head Way walking and cycling routes.
- Mizen Head – Ireland's southernmost point, with views of Fastnet Rock and Lighthouse
- Kinsale
- Whiddy Island and Whiddy Island view on R572 road

== Impact ==
The Wild Atlantic Way has had a significant impact on tourism in the Republic of Ireland, attracting millions of visitors from around the world. It has also provided a boost to local economies, particularly in rural areas where tourism is a key industry. The route has been widely recognized for its role in promoting sustainable tourism and preserving the natural and cultural heritage of the west coast of Ireland.

== Gallery ==
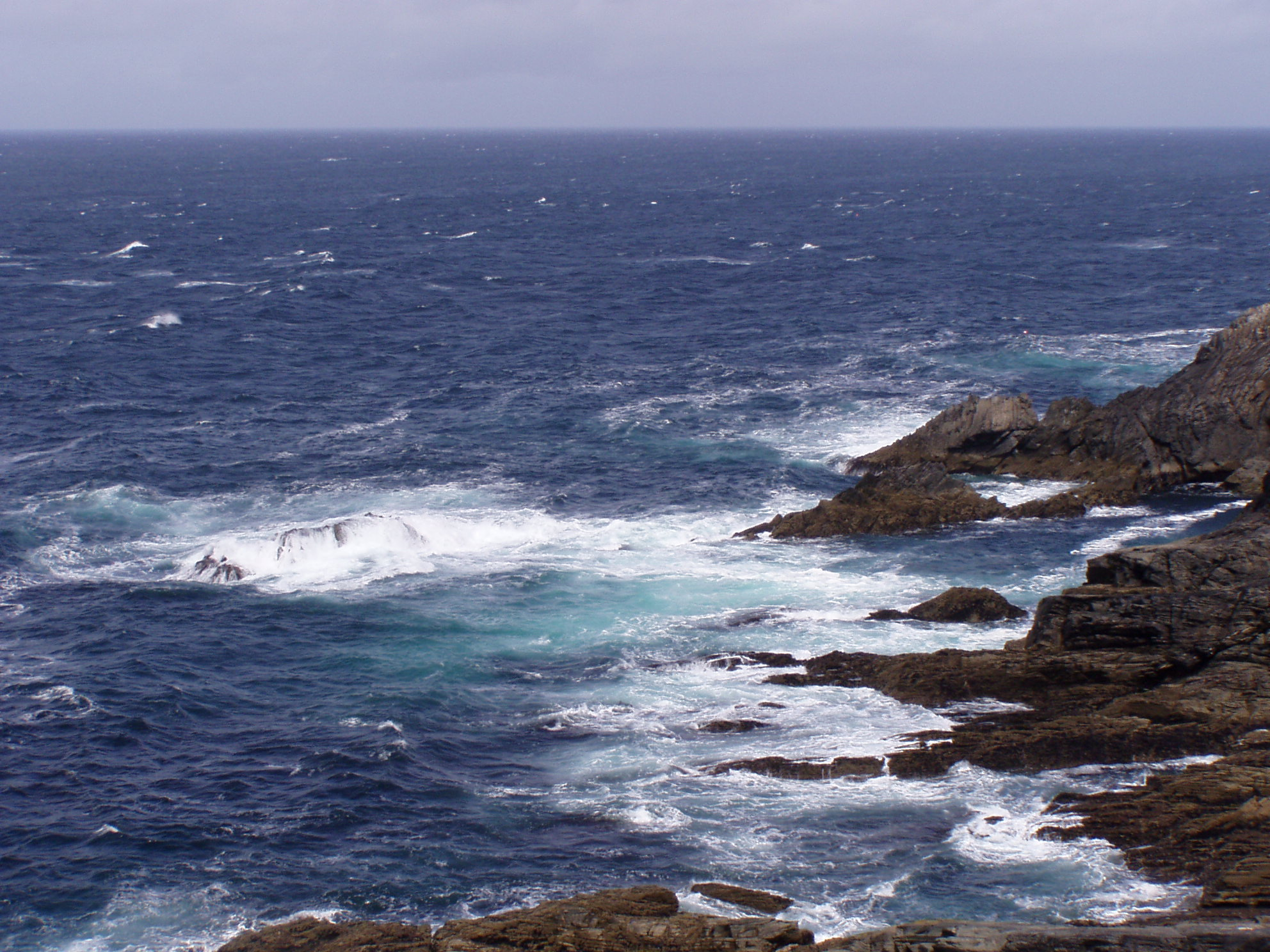
Malin Head, at the northern end of the Wild Atlantic Way in County Donegal

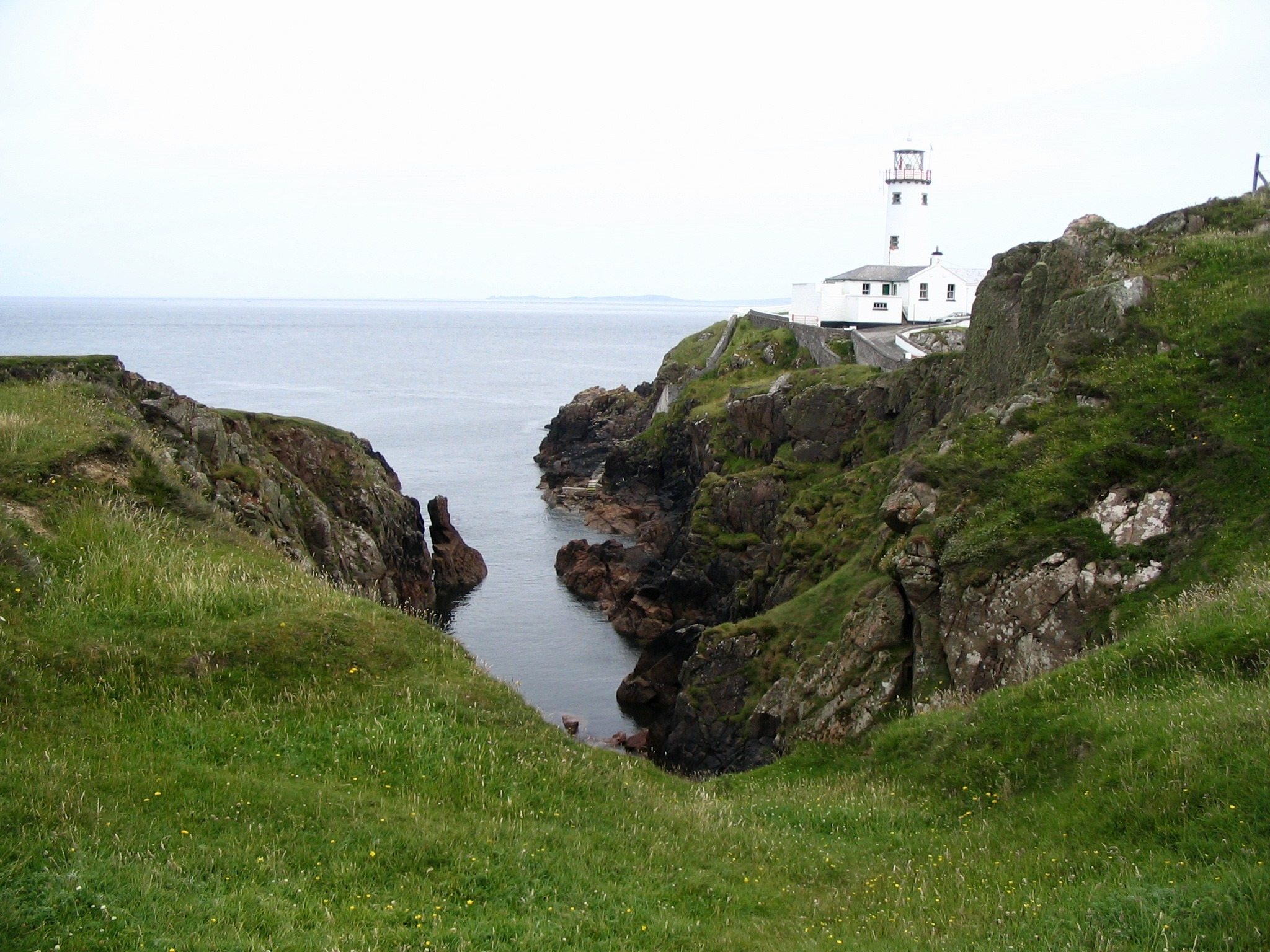
Fanad Head Lighthouse, County Donegal

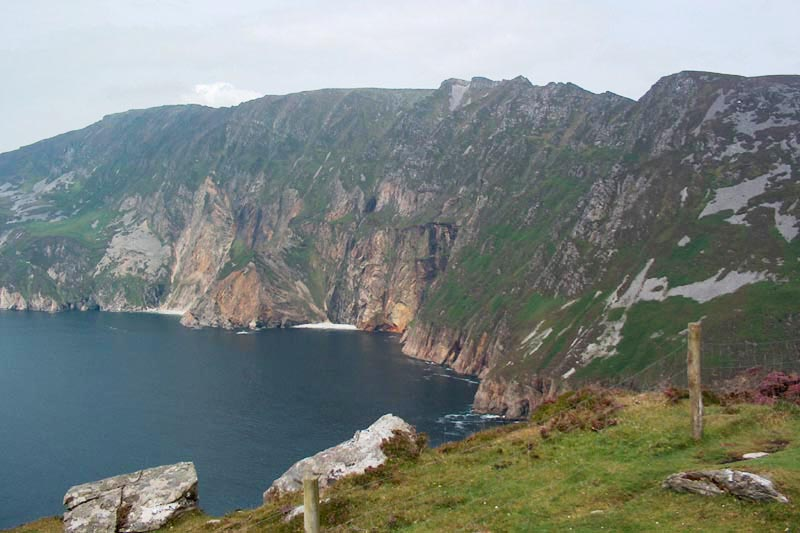
The Slieve League cliffs (Donegal, Ulster).

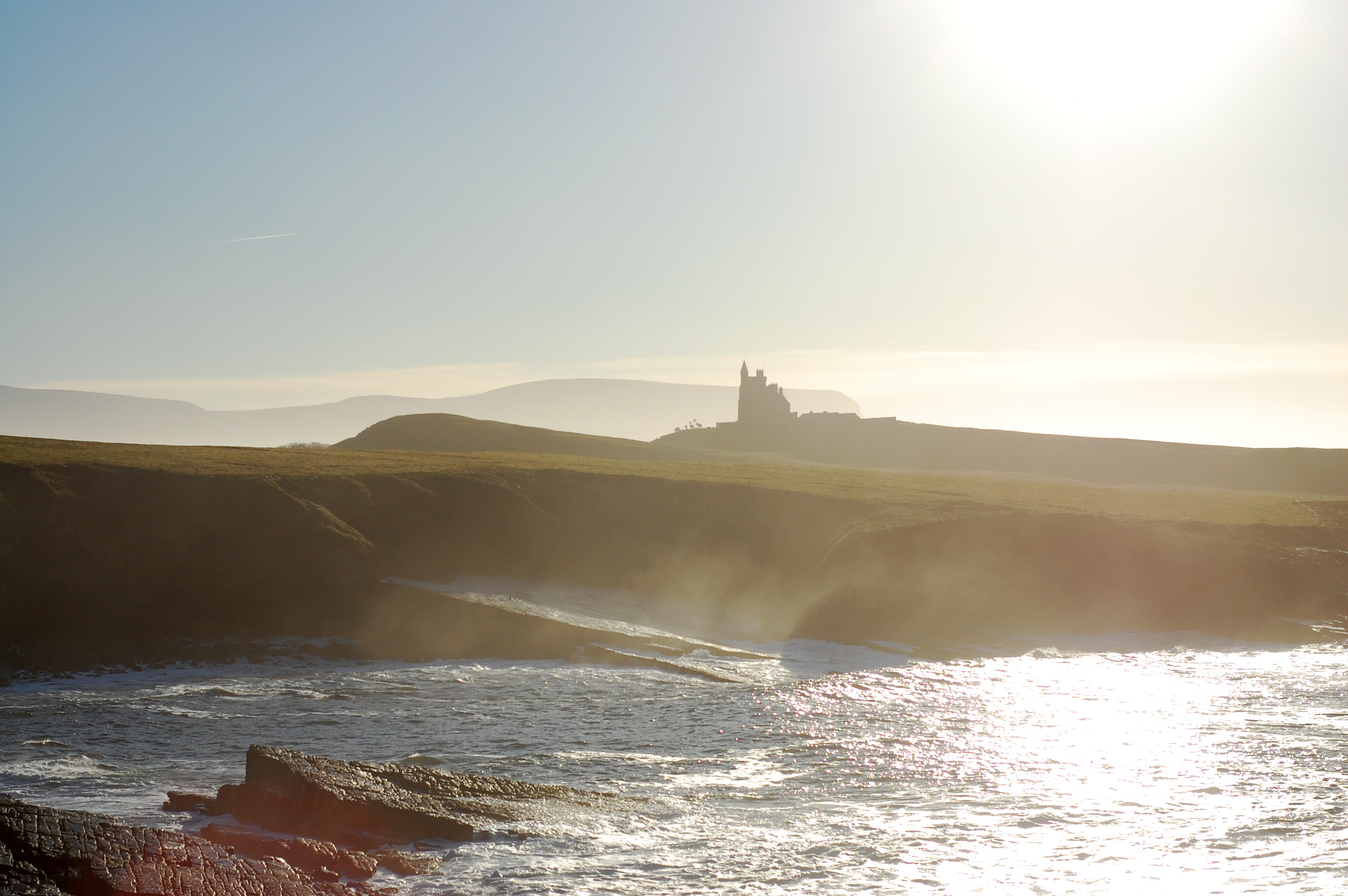
Mullaghmore (Sligo, Connacht).

== See also ==
- Antrim Coast Road
- Atlantic Corridor
- EuroVelo 1 Atlantic Coast Cycle Route
- Ireland's Ancient East
- Kerry Way
- Western Rail Corridor
- List of tourist attractions in Ireland
