= Allihies Copper Mine Museum =

- Musaem Mianaigh Umha na nAilichí

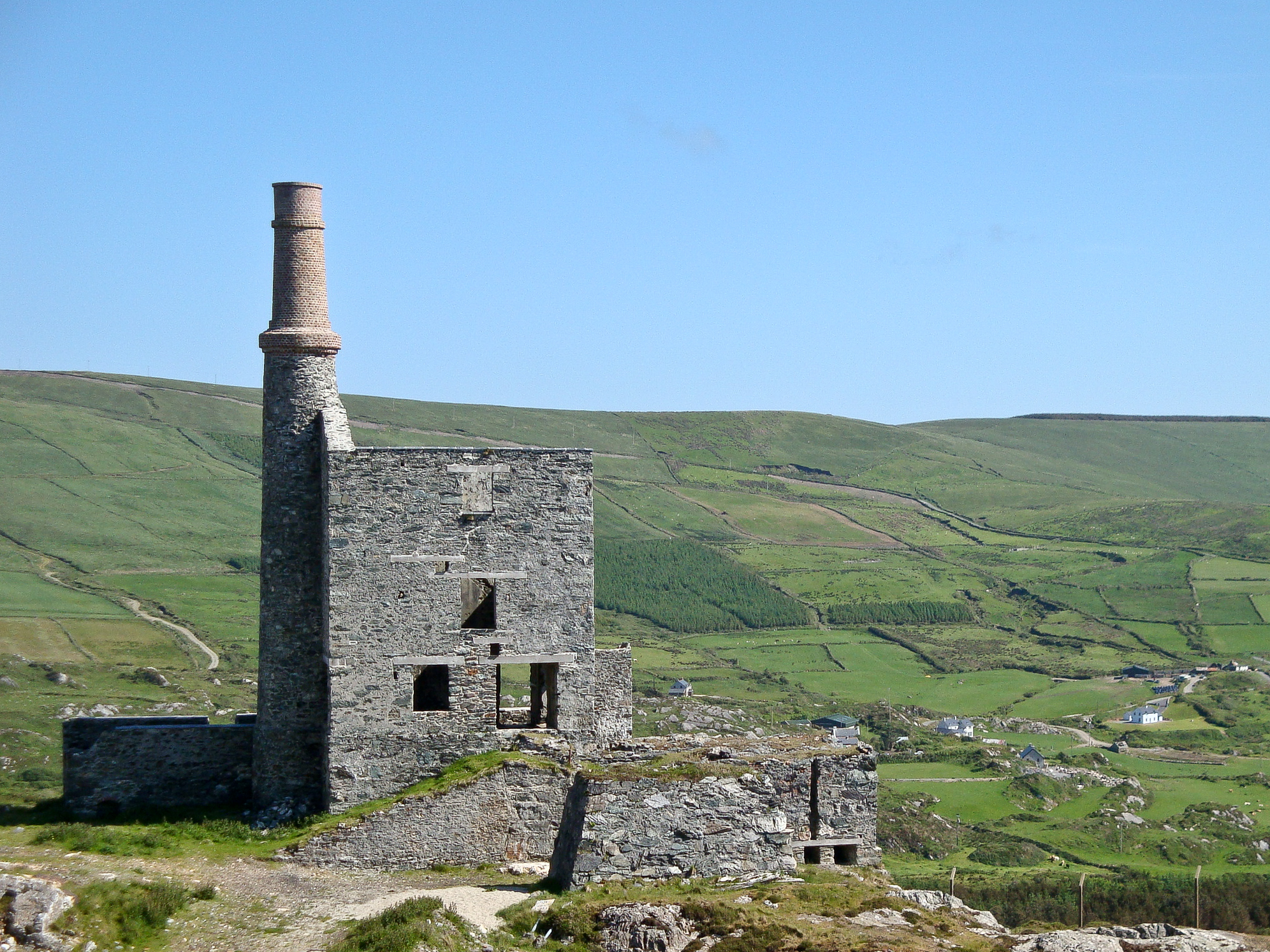
- Engine House

- Location within Ireland
- Established: 2007
- Location: Allihies, County Cork, Ireland
- Coordinates: 51.6390°N 10.0456°W
- Type: Copper mining museum
- Website: www.acmm.ie

The Allihies Copper Mine Museum (ACMM) is a museum dedicated to the history of copper mining in the Allihies area in County Cork, Ireland. It is situated on the Wild Atlantic Way.

== History ==
The industrial mines in Allihies date back to 1812 when they were first opened by John Puxley. Mining activity reached its peak there in 1845, when the mines employed around 1600 people, after which the mines suffered with the local area during the Famine. The mines were operational until 1962, when they were finally closed. Large Cornish engine houses were constructed around the mining site, ruins of which survive today. These were used to pump out water to allow for deeper mining, and to transport miners and equipment down shafts that went below sea level. The site still contains a number of engine houses, mining shafts and a church. These were constructed by and for the Cornish miners who were brought to the area in the 1800s to mine copper ore. Once the mine became unprofitable, many of the miners emigrated to Butte, Montana.

The museum is housed in a renovated Methodist church dating from 1845. It was officially opened by President Mary McAleese on 13 September 2007, after ten years of work by the Allihies Mines Co-op, a group that was formed to preserve the history of the area and mining heritage, supported by the Mining Heritage Trust of Ireland.

== Exhibitions and tour ==
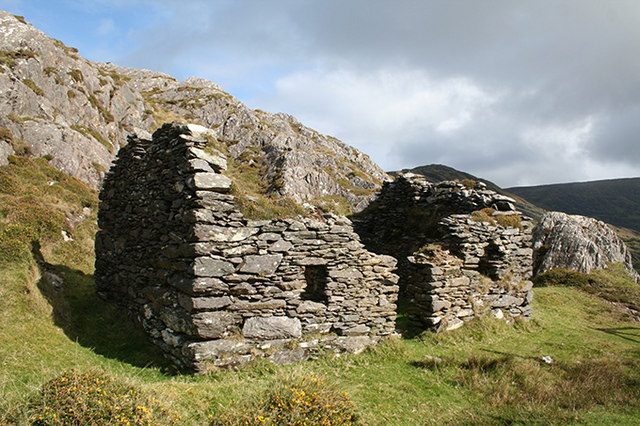
Old building, Mountain Mine, Allihies

The exhibitions cover all aspects of the history of copper mining in the area, from prehistoric times all the way up to the nineteenth century and the Industrial Revolution. The displays also cover the local geology and the social history of the mining heritage. The collections contain examples of mining equipment and tools from the various eras of activity. The exhibition space is also used to display artworks, with local and International artists such as Charles Tyrrell, Cormac Boydell, Rachel Parry, Tim Goulding and Margaret Fischer Dukeman exhibiting there.

The trust has begun work to extend tours into the mines and other areas, and started the restoration of Man Engine House.
