= Coney Island, County Sligo =

Tidal island in County Sligo, Ireland

Coney Island Inishmulclohy
Native name: Inis Uí Mhaolchluiche
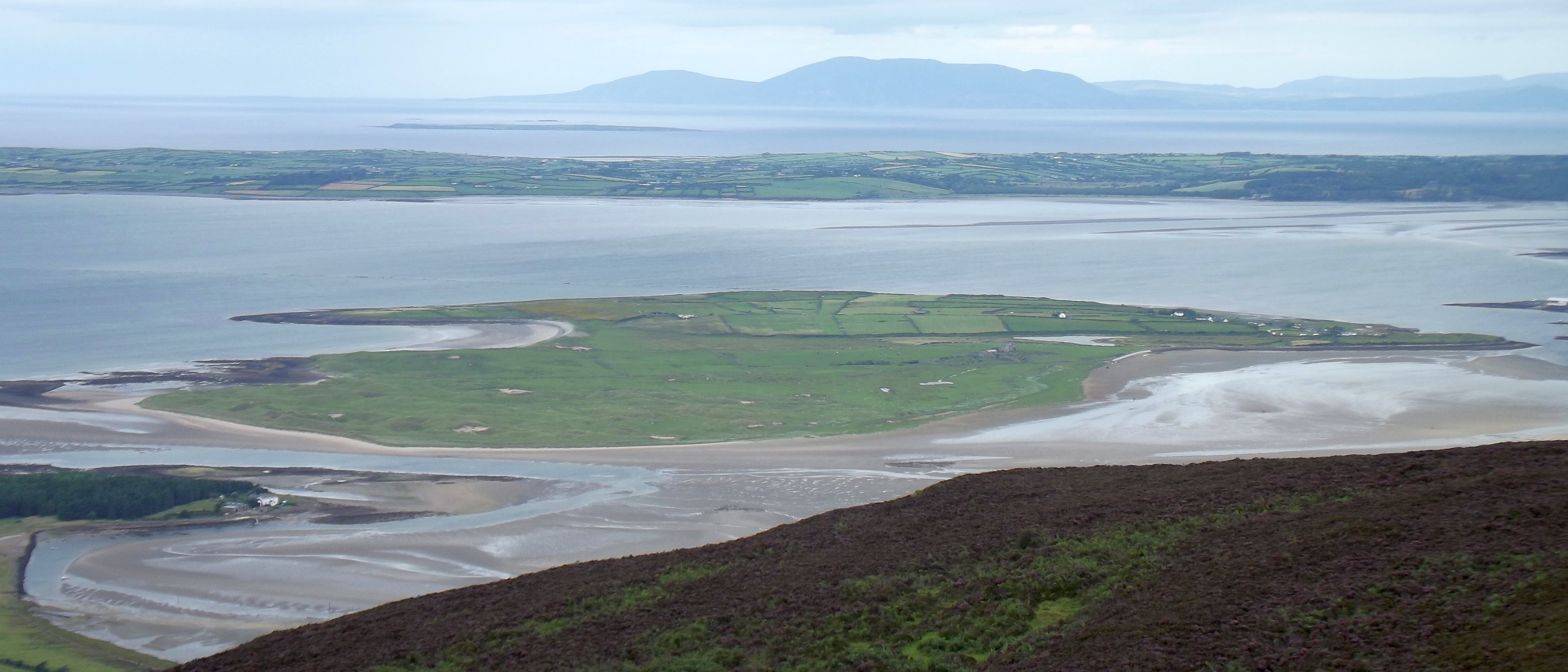
- Overview from Knocknarea

- Location within island of Ireland

Geography
- Location: Atlantic Ocean
- Coordinates: 54.2962°N 8.588°W
- Area: 1.62 km^{2} (0.63 sq mi)

Administration
- Ireland
- Province: Connacht
- County: Sligo

Demographics
- Population: 1 (2022)

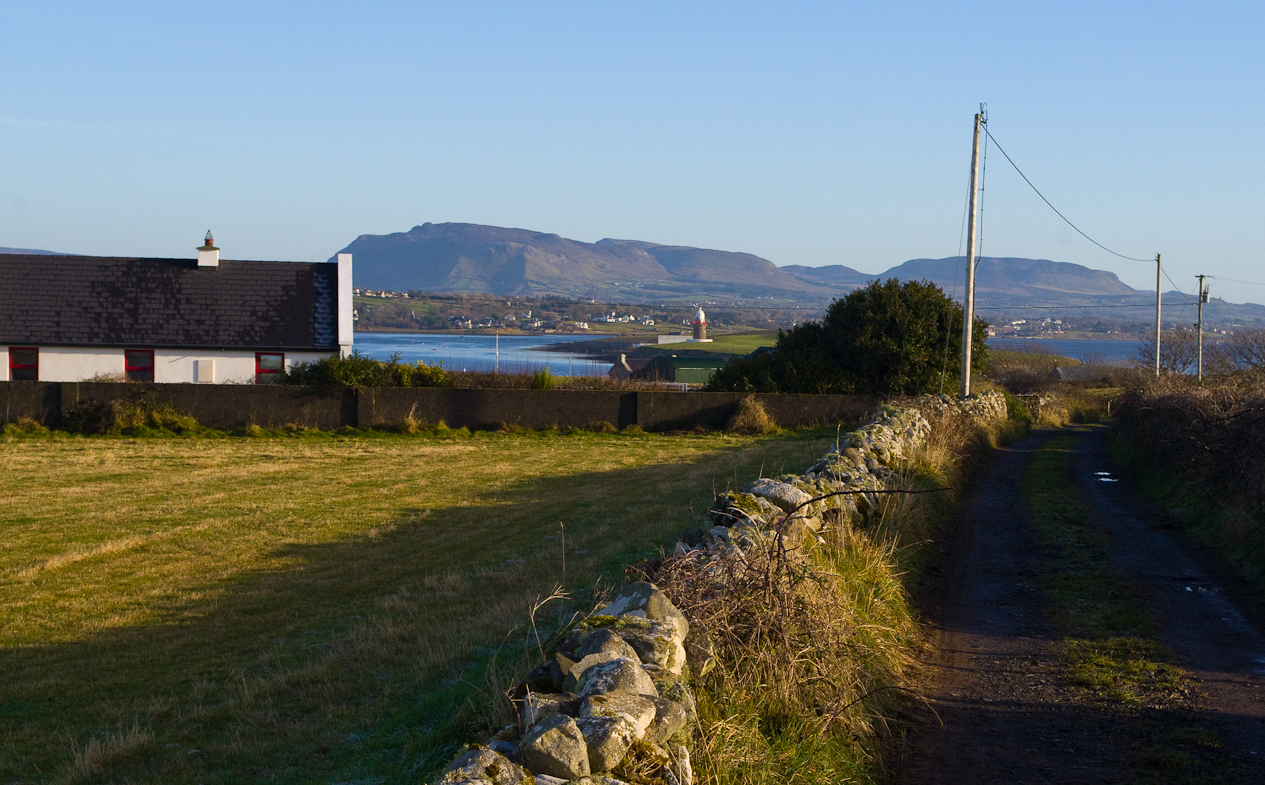
An old road on the island; mainland and Sligo in background

Coney Island or Inishmulclohy (Irish: Inis Uí Mhaolchluiche) is an island in Sligo Bay, Ireland. It lies across the mouth of Sligo Harbour, between Rosses Point and the Coolera Peninsula, and can be reached from the latter via a tidal causeway. The Irish name means "O'Mulclohy's island", in reference to a once powerful local family, while the English name means "island of rabbits".

== History ==
In 1862 the island had a population of 124 people, with 45 children attending the local school. The island now has only one family of permanent inhabitants (traceable back to the 1750s) but has many other temporary residents, especially in the summer months. The island gained electricity in 1999 via an underground cable.

=== Demographics ===
Historical population

Year	Pop.	±%
1841	124	—
1851	104	−16.1%
1861	95	−8.7%
1871	93	−2.1%
1881	59	−36.6%
1891	57	−3.4%
1901	64	+12.3%
1911	59	−7.8%
1926	47	−20.3%

Year	Pop.	±%
1936	36	−23.4%
1946	29	−19.4%
1951	25	−13.8%
1956	14	−44.0%
1961	10	−28.6%
1966	9	−10.0%
1971	5	−44.4%
1979	7	+40.0%
1981	7	+0.0%

Year	Pop.	±%
1986	6	−14.3%
1991	5	−16.7%
1996	6	+20.0%
2002	3	−50.0%
2006	6	+100.0%
2011	2	−66.7%
2016	3	+50.0%
2022	1	−66.7%

== Folklore ==
There are also stories of faeries, mermaids and spirits on Coney Island, and visitors can try to find the elusive St Patrick's wishing chair, St Patrick's well, the remains of a washed up whale and some fairy forts.

In the late 1700s, the merchant ship Arethusa sailed the route between Sligo and New York City. Regarding the naming of New York's Coney Island: one theory is that the ship's captain named that island after Sligo's Coney Island.

== Access ==
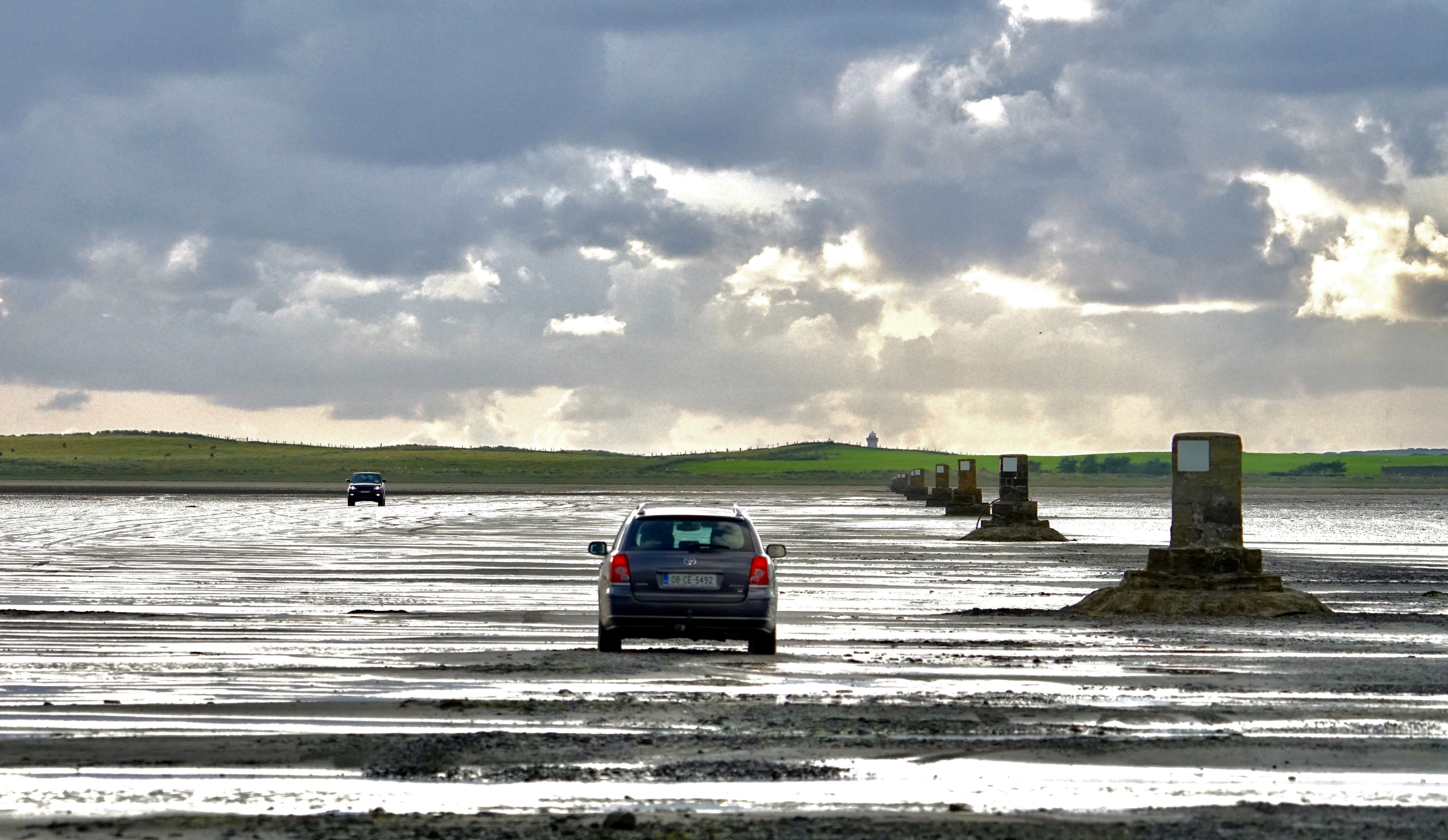
The Coney Island causeway

Coney Island is accessible by boat from Rosses Point, or by driving or walking over the causeway, two and a half kilometres across Cummeen Strand, guided by 14 pillars, at low tide. The bollards were constructed in the mid-1800s, lining up with the Black Rock lighthouse, to aid in night time travel across the bay. A spate of drowning tragedies in the 1800s, including that of the owner of the island, William Dorrin, in 1823, prompted the construction of the bollards.

== See also ==
- List of islands of Ireland
