= River Garavogue =

River in County Sligo, Ireland

Coordinates: 54.274°N 8.475°W

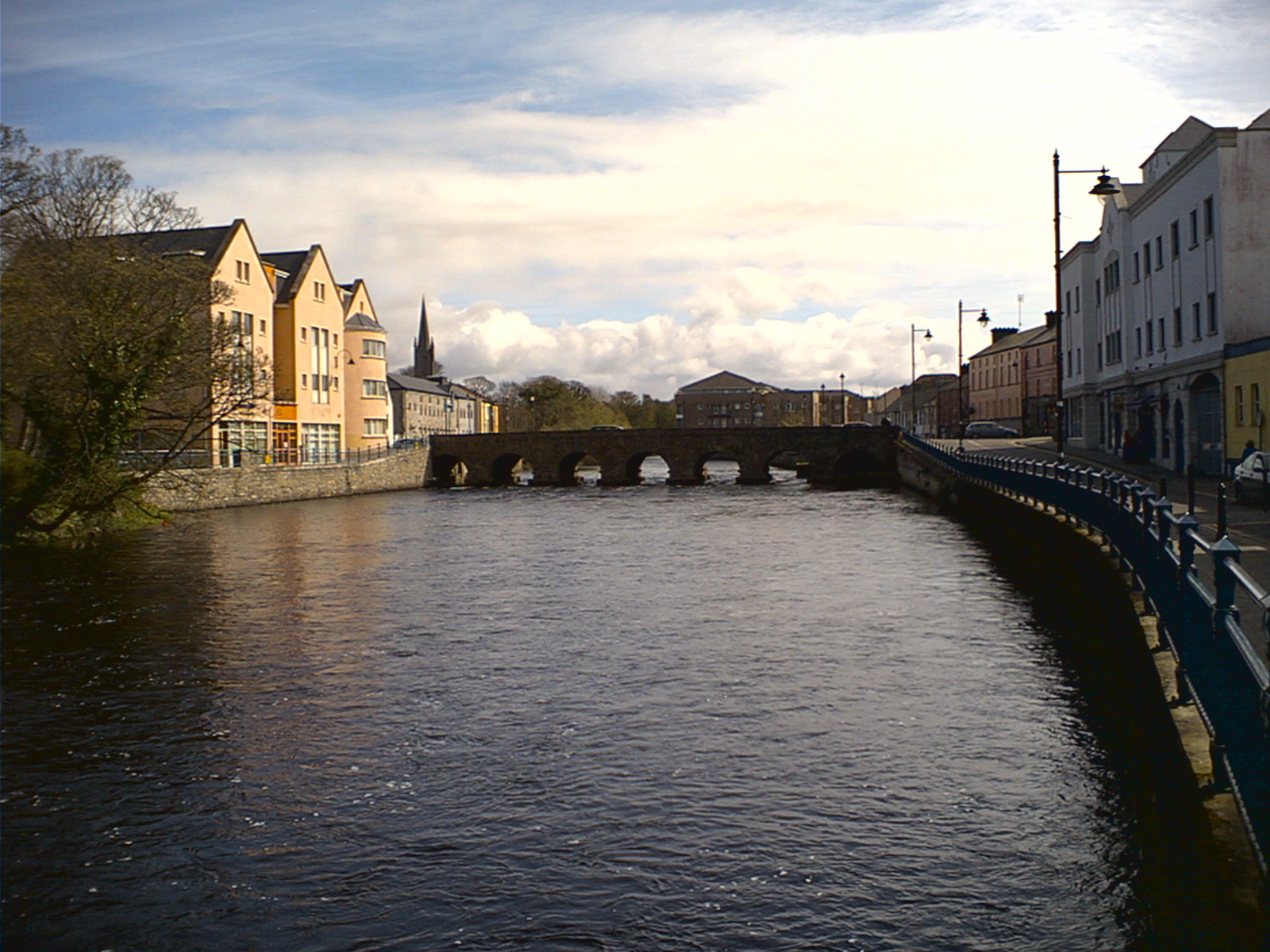
- River Garavogue in the centre of Sligo Town
- Native name: An Gharbhóg (Irish)

Physical characteristics
- Source
  - location: Lough Gill
- Mouth
  - location: Atlantic Ocean at Sligo Bay

The Garavogue or Garvoge (Irish: An Gharbhóg is a river in County Sligo, northwest Ireland, known historically as the Sligeach or Sligo River.

== Etymology ==
Garavogue is not the original name of the river, which was earlier and for centuries called the Sligeach, a name meaning abounding in shells, by the native local population. The river gave its name firstly to the town that grew up on its banks from the 13th century, and then to the county that was established in the late 16th and early 17th century. This name can be traced in ancient annals and other sources attesting to it for over 1,500 years.

However, by the time of early Ordnance Survey work in the 19th century, the common name had become the Garavogue, at least for the river from Lough Gill to below the bridge in the town of Sligo.

The source of the name Garavogue is uncertain, but may be based on "garbh," meaning "rough" or "gritty." In English it was also sometimes known as the Githy. Another interpretation is that the Garavogue takes its name from the local 'landscape goddess', a hag or witch who is said to have built megaliths in the region by dropping stones, and to have lived on a nearby hill with a mad king named Sweeney.

== Course ==
From Lough Gill, the Garavogue winds through Sligo town and flows into Sligo Bay. This pre-tidal course is less than two miles (3.2 km) long, making it possibly the shortest significant river in Ireland. The river's estuary continues for roughly four miles (6.4 km) out to Rosses Point. The wide estuary has a shipping channel capable of taking ships up to 10,000 tons, but it is only navigable as far as Sligo town, where there is a port facility. There is also a marina for smaller and pleasure craft.

There are three road bridges crossing the river. The most easterly is Markievicz Bridge connecting Bridge Street to Thomas Street, then Hyde Bridge, between Stephen Street and Lower Knox Street, and finally Hughes Bridge (often known locally as the New Bridge as it was built in 1980s), connecting Markievicz Road to Custom House Quay. There are also two footbridges, the John Fallon Footbridge, to the east of the river, connecting Riverside to Calry Parish Church and the Mall and the (unnamed) footbridge about half-way between Markievicz Bridge and Hyde Bridge, which connects Rockwood Parade to Queen Maeve Square.

The whole river system and catchment (including Lough Gill and the Bonet River) is 31.5 miles (50.7 km) long.

== History ==
The Garavogue is mentioned in Early Medieval texts as one of the "nine royal rivers" of Ireland. Saint Patrick is said to have blessed it so that it would produce salmon all year round.

The battle of Sligo (river) took place at this river in 536 AD between Eoghan Bél, King of Connacht and the forces of two branches of the Uí Néill of Ulster.

== Bonet River ==
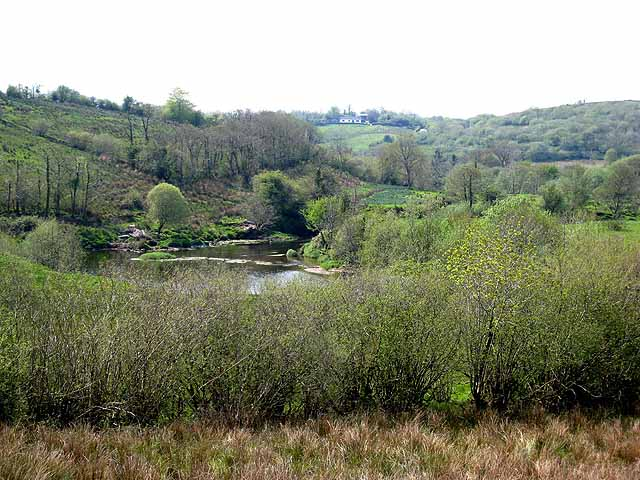
Valley of the Bonet River

As a major tributary, the Bonet River (Irish: An Bhuannaid) is indirectly linked to the Garvoge (as it is spelt on Ordnance Survey Ireland Discovery maps) by Lough Gill. Virtually all of the river is in County Leitrim. It has its source in Glenade Lough in the north of County Leitrim, and flows south-east towards Manorhamilton, passing west of the town, turning south then south-west towards Dromahair, before turning north-west past the village, and finally north for the last mile, where it borders onto County Sligo, to Lough Gill.
