= Allihies =

Townland in County Cork, Ireland

Allihies Na hAilichí
- Townland
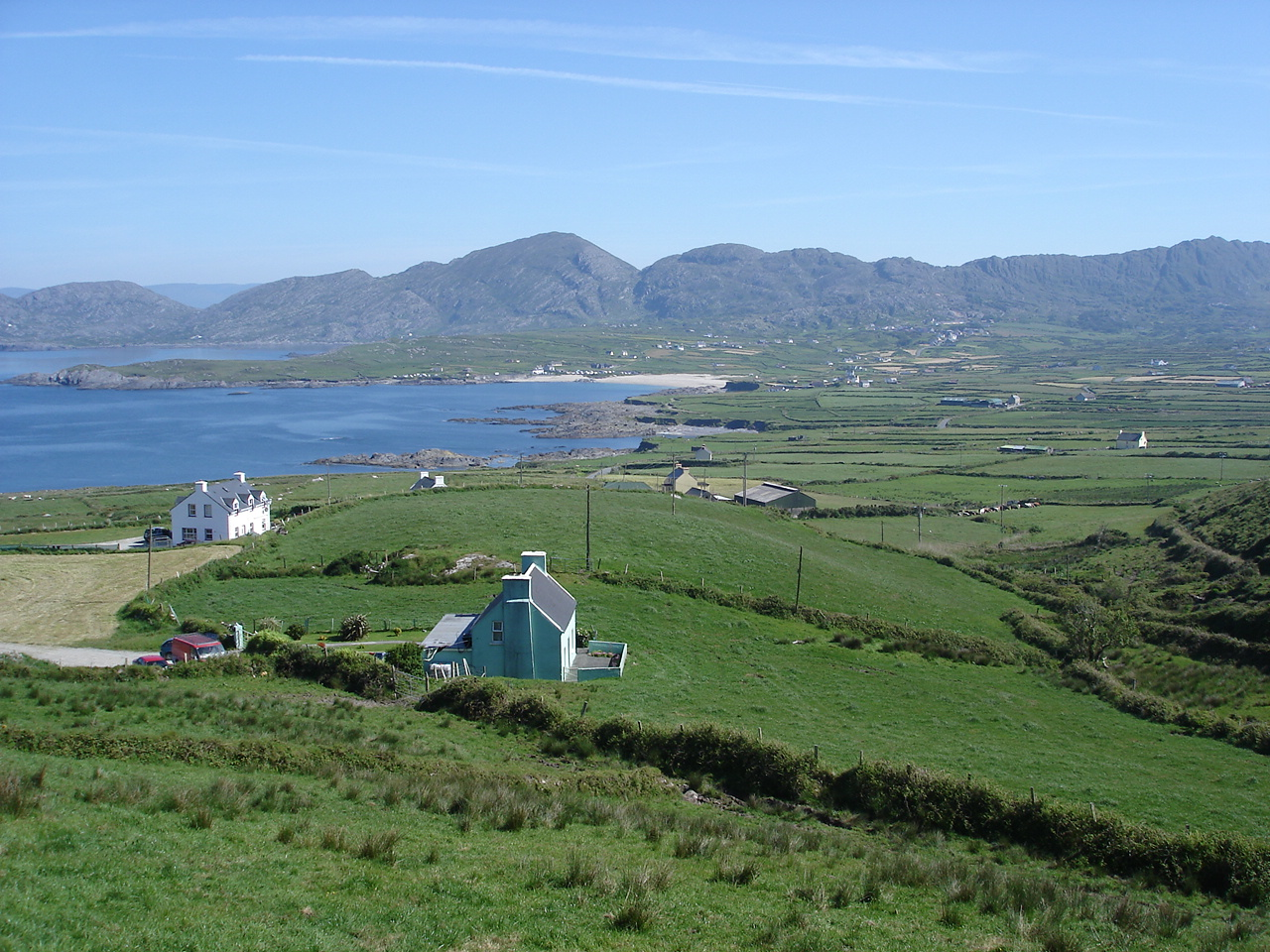
- View over Allihies and Ballydonegan Bay

- Location in Ireland
- Coordinates: 51°38′N 10°02′W
- Country: Ireland
- Province: Munster
- County: County Cork
- Time zone: UTC+0 (WET)
  - Summer (DST): UTC-1 (IST (WEST))

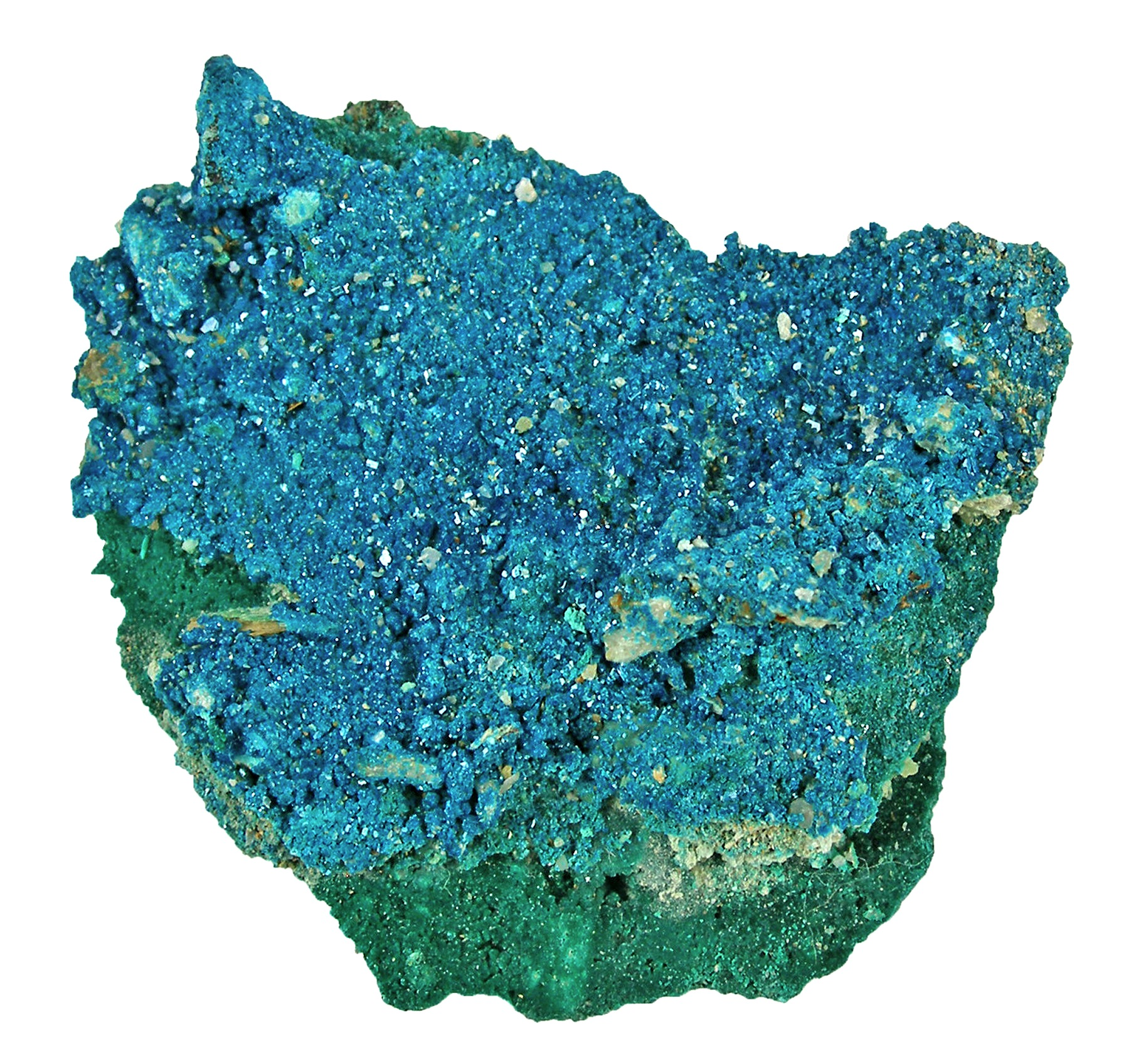
Langite, a copper sulfate, from Mountain Mine, Allihies.

Allihies (/ælˈæhiːz/; Irish: Na hAilichí, meaning 'the cliff fields') is a townland in the civil parish of Kilnamanagh, in County Cork, Ireland. The townland of Allihies is located at the western tip of the Beara Peninsula.

== History of copper mining ==
From the Bronze Age the area had been a site of copper-mining. In 1812 John Lavallin Puxley (1772–1856) established a company to operate the Berehaven copper mines at Allihies. During the following century, between 1812 and 1912, 297,000 tons of ore were recorded as passing through the smelter at Swansea in Wales from the mines at Allihies. Drilling during this period by the Berehaven company took place throughout the townland of Allihies, and the adjacent townlands of Cloan and Kealoge.

Three ruined Cornish engine houses are visible from Allihies. The most visually prominent is the Mountain Mine man engine house, located on the skyline above the village, and installed by the noted Cornish engineers Michael Loam and Son in 1862.

In the late nineteenth century, newly developed sources of copper ore were being worked in Africa, the Americas and Australia. A resulting fall in the worldwide price of copper led in 1884 to the closure of the mining operations at Allihies. The area saw large-scale emigration, with many of the miners finding their way to newly developing mining centres in the United States and Canada. Among these centres is Butte, Montana, where many families (Lowneys, Harringtons and others) trace their ancestry to Allihies and the Beara peninsula.

Can-Erin Mines during the 1950s and 1960s dewatered the Mountain Mine and conducted evaluation drilling, resulting in an assessment that a reopening was not economically viable, given projected operating costs and world copper prices. The company noted, however, that the Mountain Mine "has significant untested resource potential"

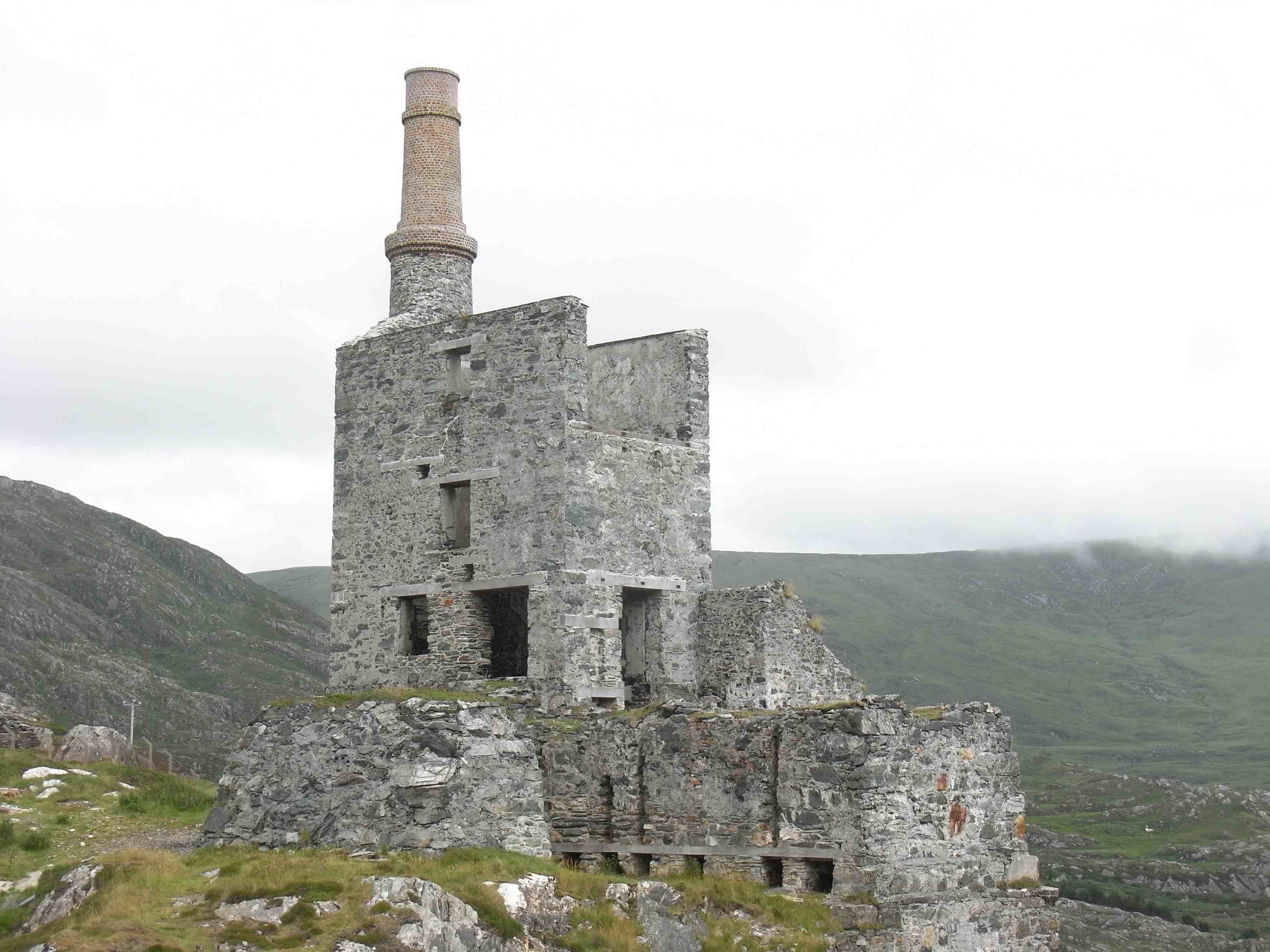
Engine house of the Mountain Mine.

The Mountain Mine engine house has recently (2003) undergone conservation by the Mining Heritage Trust of Ireland. The completed conservation project and some of the underground mine workings were the subject of the TV documentary programme "Townlands" on RTÉ One in 2005.

Daphne du Maurier’s novel Hungry Hill is a fictionalized saga of several generations of a mine-owning dynasty and based loosely on the history of the Puxley family.

== Festivals ==
The annual Allihies Festival traditionally takes place on 15 August. It usually features horse racing - a practice probably dating from the time of more widespread use of horses and ponies in the copper mining industry. It takes place in a setting between the ocean and the surrounding mountains. The festivities now extend through the week and feature music, bale tossing and other events.

In 2008-9 the village also hosted the Michael Dwyer Festival of Traditional Irish music, which commemorates the life of a Beara musician and composer.

== Presidential visits ==
In 2007 the parish was visited by the President of Ireland, Mary McAleese for the opening of the Allihies Copper Mine Museum, commemorating the area's mining heritage. The museum is housed in the chapel built by Cornish miners in 1845. The veins of copper at Allihies were discovered in 1812 and worked until 1884 and many Cornish mine captains, miners and craftsmen were employed alongside Irish people.

The village also attracted attention in June 1990 when it was chosen as one of the first places that Mary Robinson visited in her successful campaign for election as President of Ireland.

== Children of Lir legend ==
The mythical story Children of Lir is well known in Ireland, with several areas claimed as the landing spot of the swans after their 900-year journey on the seas. One version of this oral tradition holds that the children of Lir were buried in Allihies. A site associated with this tradition is located near the village.
