= Metal Man (beacon) =

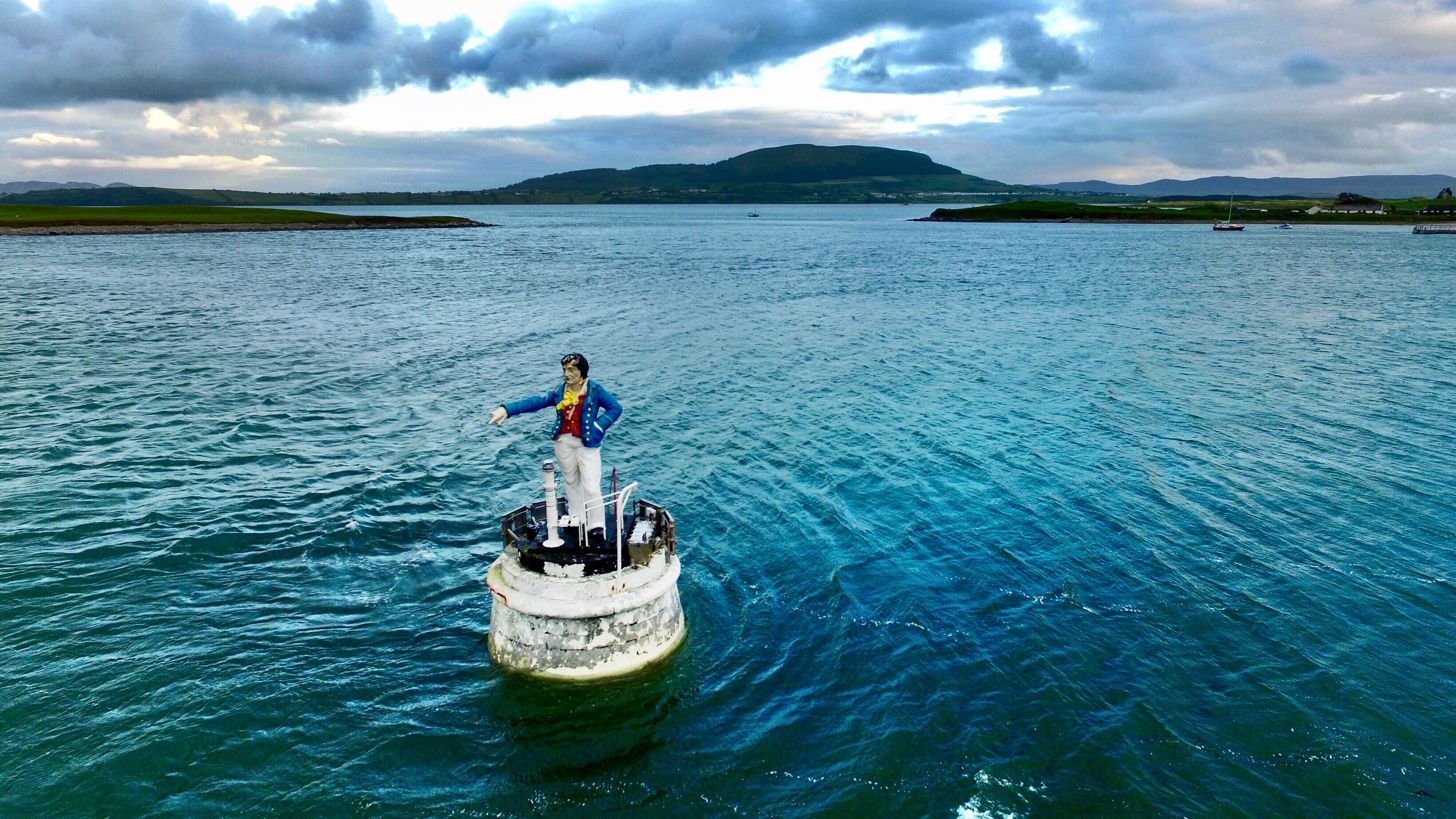
- Metal Man beacon
- Location: County Sligo, Ireland
- Coordinates: 54°18′13″N 8°34′32″W
- Constructed: 1819
- Construction: Cast-iron, metal-plate

Light
- First lit: 1821
- Focal height: 3 m (9.8 ft)
- Range: 7 nmi (13 km; 8.1 mi)
- Characteristic: Fl(3) W 6.1s

The Metal Man (Irish: An Fear Miotail) is a beacon off the coast of the Rosses Point Peninsula in County Sligo, Ireland.

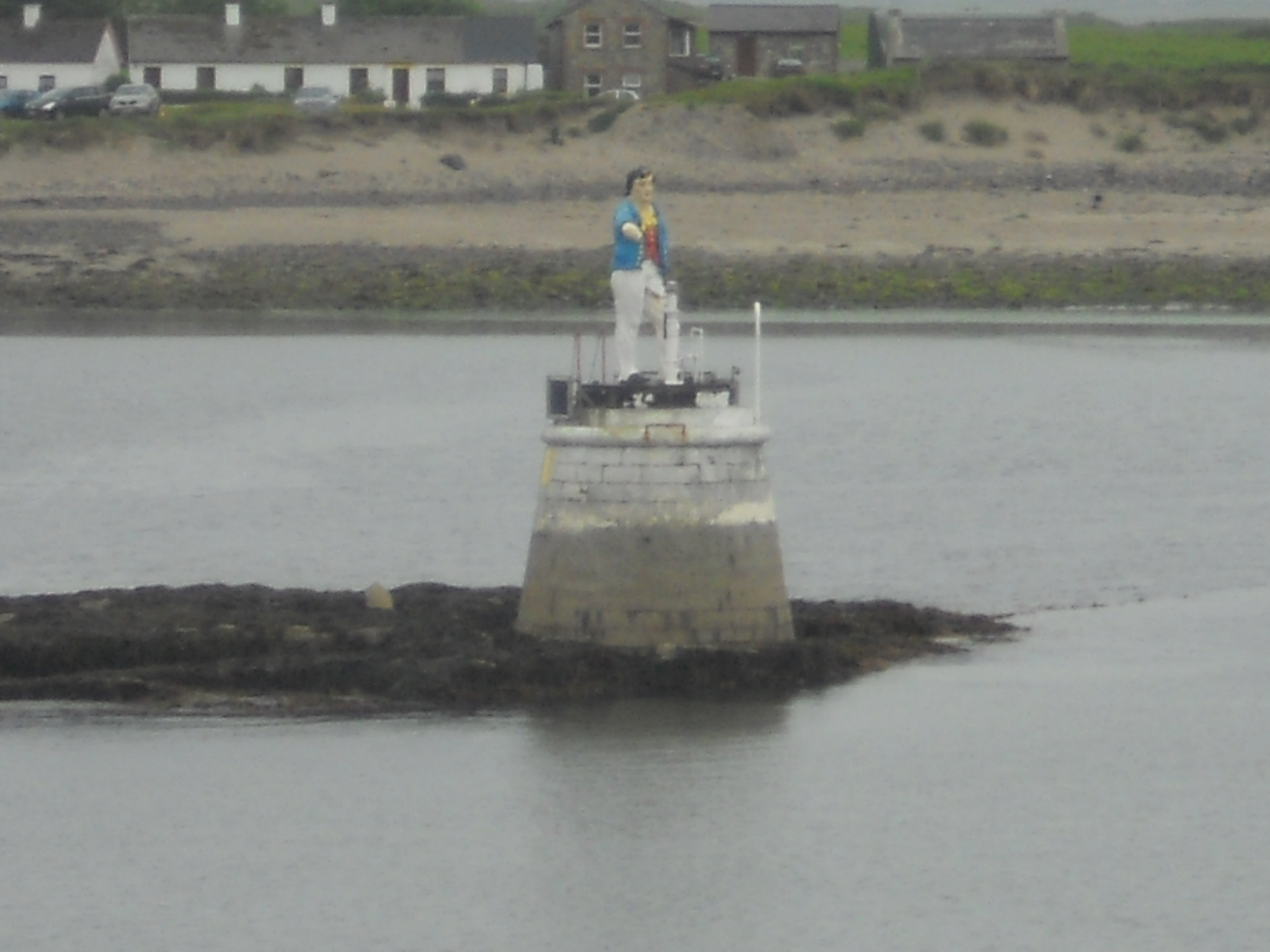
The Metal Man viewed from the shore

There are other similar Metal Men beacons in Tramore, County Waterford and Dalkey (Nerano Man), County Dublin.

== History ==
The Metal Man is a freestanding painted cast iron statue of a Royal Navy petty officer of the Age of Sail. It is placed between Rosses Point and Oyster Island. It was cast in 1819 by Thomas Kirke in London.

It was placed on Perch Rock in 1821. It was originally made for the Blackrock Beacon, but Sligo merchants suggested it be placed on Perch Rock. It has an identical twin beacon in Tramore, County Waterford. From 16 October 1908, an acetylene light was placed beside the beacon. In 1934, it was changed from a single red flash every 3 seconds to a double red flash every 5 seconds. From 2003, it was converted from gas to solar power, and is only illuminated at night.

The Metal Man was depicted in paintings several times by Jack Butler Yeats, including in Memory Harbour.

There is a campaign undertaken by a local group which has been highlighting the deteriorating condition of the beacon called Save the Metal Man.

== See also ==
- List of lighthouses in Ireland
