= Rosses Point =

Village in County Sligo, Ireland

Rosses Point Irish: An Ros
- Village
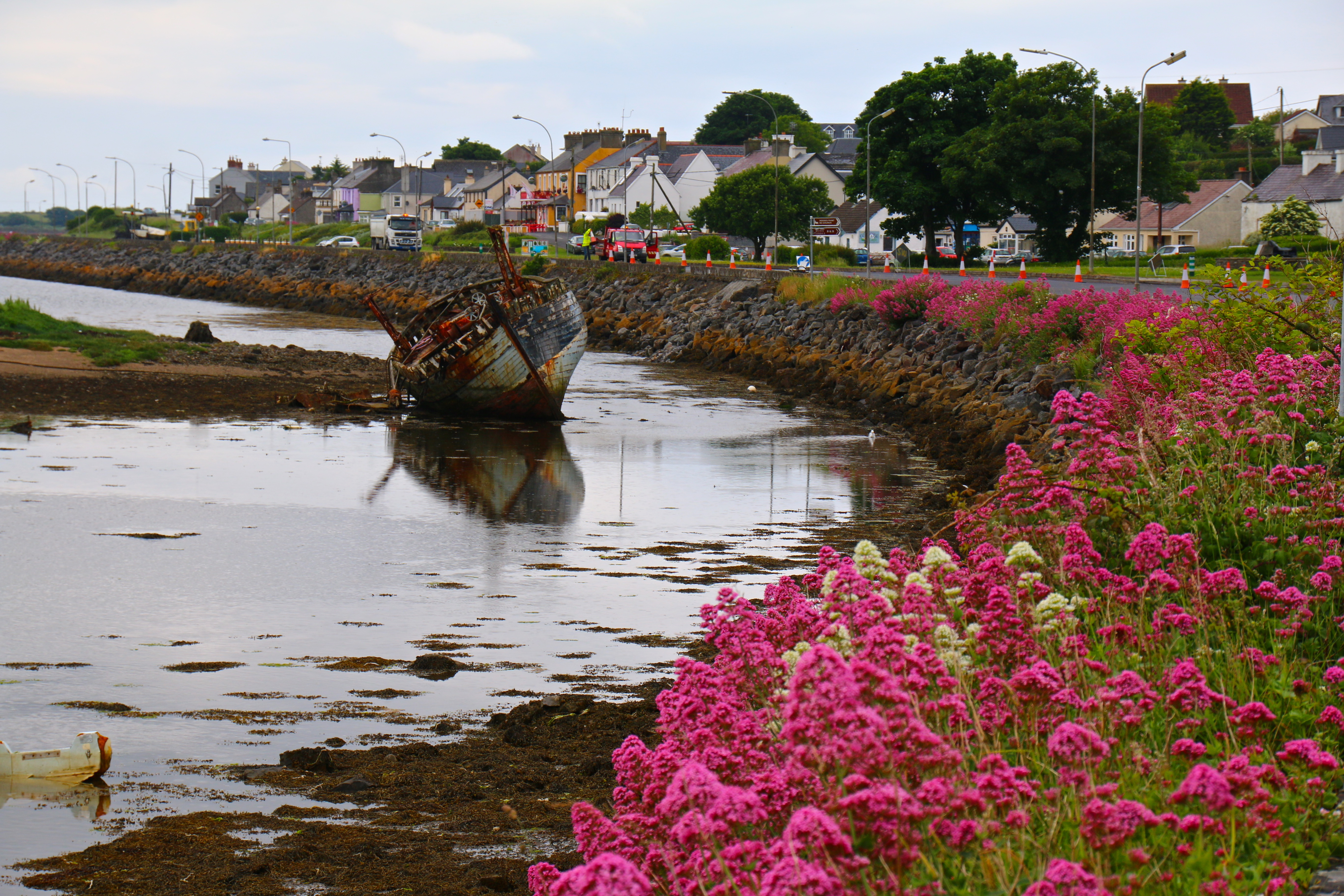

- Location in Ireland
- Coordinates: 54°18′33″N 8°33′58″W
- Country: Ireland
- Province: Connacht
- County: County Sligo

Population (2022)
  - Total: 883
- Time zone: UTC+0 (WET)
  - Summer (DST): UTC-1 (IST (WEST))
- Irish Grid Reference: G631401

Rosses Point (Irish: Ros Cheide, meaning 'promontary of the hill/assembly (trans. Cheide uncertain)' or Irish: An Ros) is a village in County Sligo, Ireland, and also the name of the surrounding peninsula.

Rosses Point is at the entrance to Sligo Harbour from Sligo Bay with Oyster Island being the long thin landmass notable when entering the village from Sligo town and Inishmulclohy (or Coney Island) being the second and larger island that is encountered.

== History and places of interest ==
=== Lighthouses ===
==== Metal Man Lighthouse ====
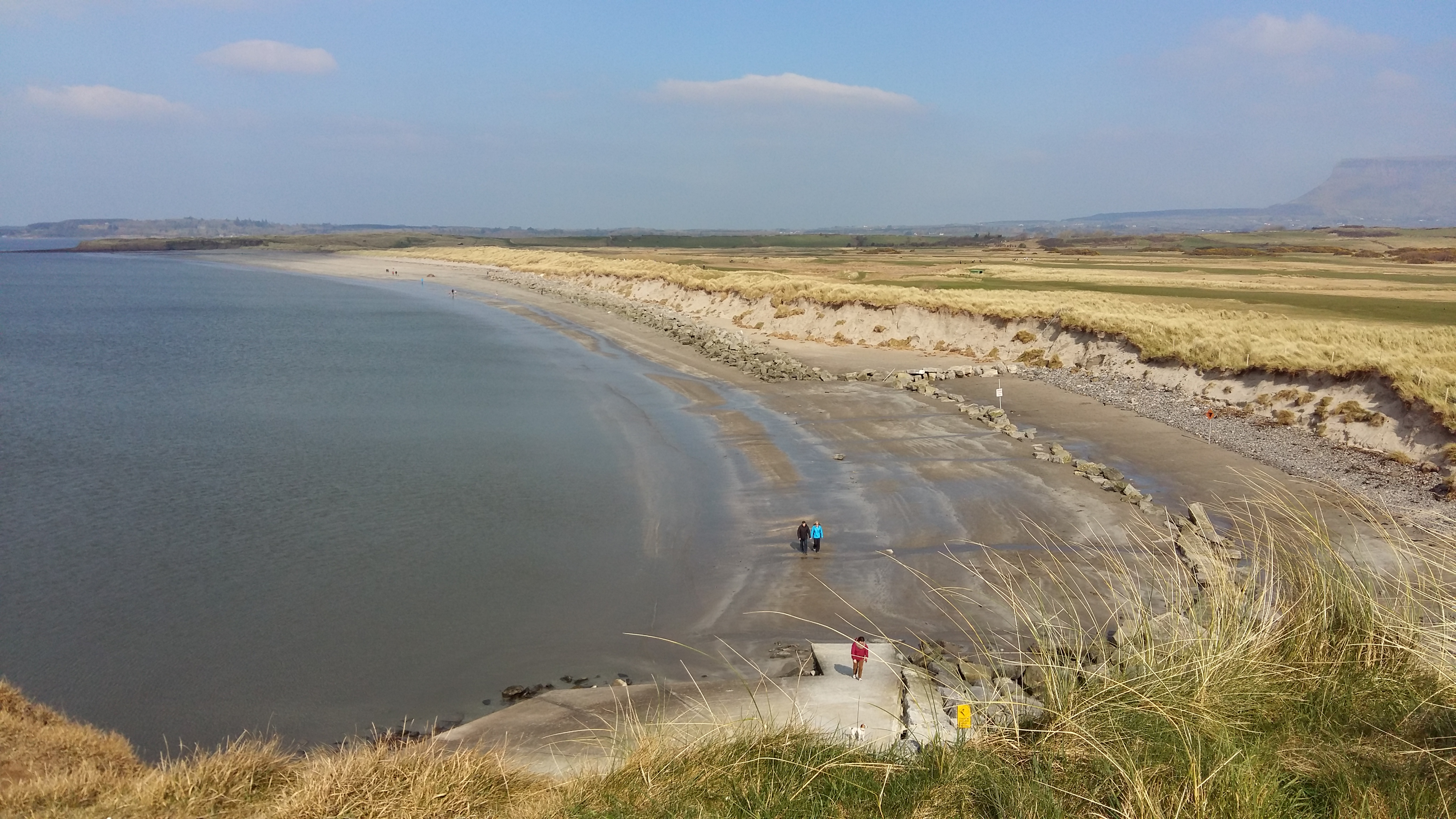
Rosses Point beach

The Metal Man lighthouse, a 3.7 metres (12 ft) high guardian statue placed offshore at the point by local seafarers in 1821 is maintained by the Commissioners of Irish Lights.

==== Oyster Island Lighthouse ====
The freestanding 12 m (39 ft) Oyster Island Lighthouse is prominently visible at the end west end of Oyster Island from the R291 road into Rosses Point.

==== Lower Rosses Lighthouse ====
The Lower Rosses Light is an 8 m (26 ft) high square structure on wooden staves to guide boats down the Needles Channel to Drumcliff bay. Originally built in 1908 it is now solar powered. It can be seen at the northern end of the Rosses Point Peninsula.

=== Waiting on Shore monument ===
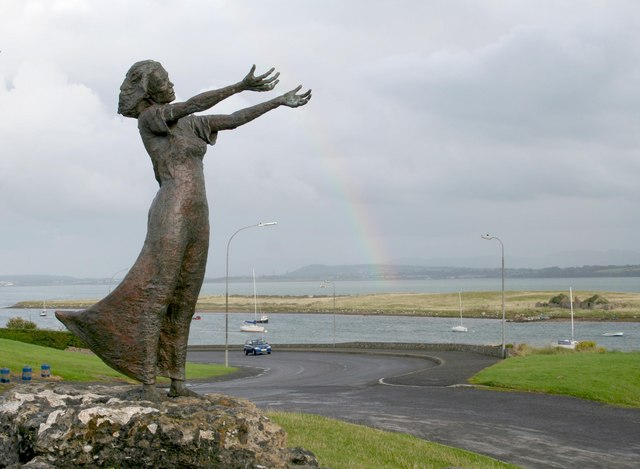
Waiting On Shore monument

The "Waiting on Shore" monument, appropriately situated near the RNLI lifeboat station, depicts a woman holding her arms out to sea. A plate at the base includes the following:

Lost at sea, lost at sea
Or in the evening tide
We loved you, we miss you
May God with you abide.

=== Spanish shipwrecks ===
In 1985 at Streedagh Strand, north of Rosses Point, marine archaeologists uncovered the wrecks of three ships of the Spanish Armada, La Lavia, La Juliana, and Santa Maria de Vison, which a storm drove onto this coast in September 1588.

=== Elsinore House ===
The poet William Butler Yeats and his brother, the artist Jack Butler Yeats, spent their summer holidays at Elsinore House, in Rosses Point.

Elsinore House was the seat of the Middleton Family where the Yeats brothers spent many a summer with their cousins. The house was built by the smuggler John Black or Black Jack. It is said to be still haunted by the ghosts of smugglers tapping on the windows at night. The house has fallen into disrepair and, even though restoration plans have been proposed, it remains derelict. In 2016 a Heritage Council funded conservation study was proposed as a first step in securing the future of the historic Elsinore House.

=== Pier and lifeboat station ===
The Royal National Lifeboat Institution Sligo Bay Lifeboat Station is built next to the pier which harbours a number of fishing vessels.

== Amenities ==
Rosses Point is home to the Sligo Yacht Club, who hold sailing courses for children and adults in the summer months. Also held annually is the West of Ireland Championship which is hosted by County Sligo Golf Club.

Rosses Point has several Blue Flag strands which safe for swimming. Sea angling and boat charters also operate from the area with boats also servicing Coney Island and Inishmurray, and ecotourism cruises.

== Events ==
The Rosses Point Shanty Festival is held annually on a weekend around mid-June with profits to the RNLI. As well as songs and music there are duck, boating and swim, races, poetry recitals and a cake dance.

Rosses Point beach is home to the Metalman Swim Series, established in 2009 and taking place annually in June. It is considered the largest swimming event in the north-west region.

== Transport ==
Rosses Point is 8 km from Sligo town along the R291 road. Bus Éireann route S2 provides bus services every half an hour during the day.

The Urban Cycle Sligo travel scheme route 006 links Rosses Point to Scotsmans Walk in Sligo Town with dedicated cycle lanes in the R291 road.

== Notable people ==
- Peter Mair (1951–2011), political scientist, born Rosses Point
- W. J. M. Starkie (1860–1920), scholar and education reformer, born Rosses Point

== See also ==
- List of towns and villages in Ireland
