= Sligo Yacht Club =

Sligo Yacht Club is located at Rosses Point, on the Rosses Point Peninsula in County Sligo, Ireland. It has been located at its present site since 1973.

The club was redeveloped in preparation for the 2006 GP14 World Championships, which was won by Ian Dobson & Andy Tunnicliffe (Burwain S.C. / Windermere Y.C). The club has also hosted the 1979 Enterprise World Championships, 1987 Mirror World Championships and 2010 Mirror European Championships.

== Fleets ==
Gp14

Mirror Dinghy

Cruisers

Lasers

== Events hosted by SYC ==
2007

North-West Offshore Racing Association (NORA)

Irish Mirror Nationals

Gp14 Autumn open/Irish Youth championships

2008

Mirror Western championships

GP14 Ulster championships

2009

GP14 championship of Ireland

2010

European Mirror championships

GP14 summer open/Irish Youth championships

2011

Fireball world championships
