= Sligo Port =

Port in Sligo, Ireland

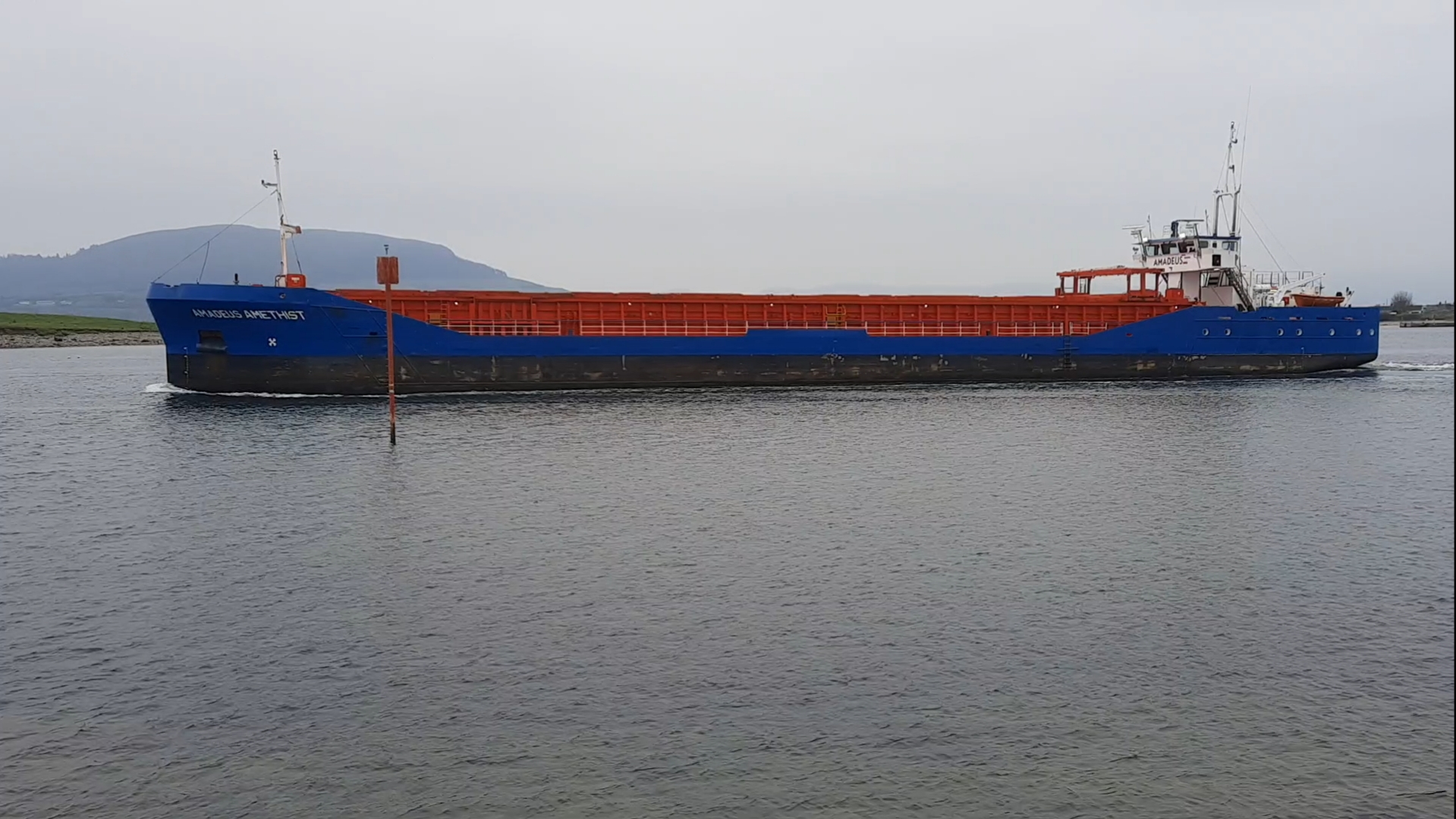
- Cargo ship entering Sligo Bay on approach to the port, with Knocknarea visible behind
- Interactive map of Sligo Port
- Location within Ireland

Location
- Country: Ireland
- Location: Sligo
- Coordinates: 54°17′00″N 8°29′34″W
- UN/LOCODE: IESLI

Details
- Operated by: Sligo County Council Harbour Office
- No. of berths: 2

Statistics
- Vessel arrivals: 27 (2025)
- Annual cargo tonnage: 42,000 (2025)
- Website; Official website

Sligo Port is a seaport in Sligo, Ireland. Located on the northwest coast of Ireland, the port is situated along the Garavogue estuary inside Sligo Bay. It is the only working port between Galway and Derry, and is operated by Sligo County Council.

== History ==
The history of Sligo as a port town goes back to at least the 13th century, when it began its development as a port for shipping agricultural goods to Britain and Europe. Mentions of a "Fish Quay" can be found in records from the 15th century, and customs duties under the Harbour Commissioner go back to 1689.

Works to construct the present line of quays occurred throughout the 19th century. In 1846, permission was granted to deepen the channel at the harbour, and in 1877 the quays reached their present-day limit at the Deepwater Quay. These developments lead to an increase in trade at the port. In the late 19th and early 20th century, Sligo Port had a number of regular services to destinations such as Liverpool and Glasgow, as well as ones closer by such as Belmullet in County Mayo, where road access was poor. The port was the site of the 1913 Sligo Dock strike, an industrial action lasting 56 days that was a precursor to the Dublin lock-out later that year. The outbreak of World War II in 1939 lead to the withdrawal of the services to Britain and a collapse in trade at the port in general.

The port has grown during the 21st century. Responsibility for the port was transferred from the Sligo Harbour Commissioners to Sligo County Council in 2006. Since then, the county council have completed a number of works, including improvements to the training walls, a refurbishment of the Deepwater Jetty, a new pontoon for small craft at the former Timber Jetty, and the reconstruction and reopening of the Barytes Jetty in 2008, increasing the capacity of the port and allowing two vessels to be loaded simultaneously. The port reported its busiest period in 50 years in 2011.

In June 2026, the world's largest replica Spanish Galleon, the Galeón Andalucía, docked at Sligo Port for a two week visit, to commemorate the 1,100 Spanish sailors who died off the Sligo coast when three ships of the Spanish Armada sunk in 1588.

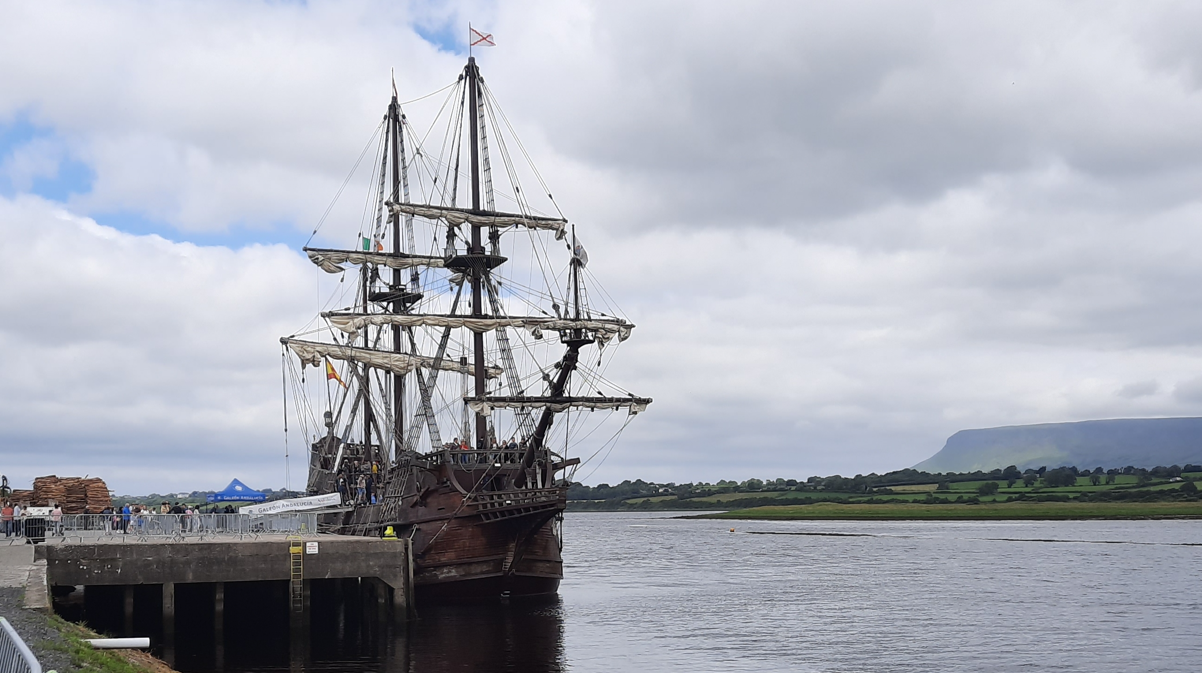
The Galeón Andalucia docked at Sligo Port, with Benbulbin visible to the right

== Operations ==
The port primarily handles bulk and breakbulk cargo such as timber logs, woodchip, fishmeal and solid fuels, with an annual throughput of approximately 42,000 tonnes of goods as of 2025.

In addition to cargo operations, there is a 60m timber pontoon closer to the town centre than the deepwater berths, which provides mooring for small boats, such as pleasure craft or fishing vessels.

== Traffic ==
The port can accommodate vessels up to 3,000 metric tonnes deadweight (DWT), with a maximum length and draft of up to 100m and 4.5m respectively. There are two berths along its quays, Deepwater Quay with a length of 75m and Barytes Quay (named for the baryte exports from the former Glencarbury mines) with a length of 55m. The port is capable of berthing two vessels at a time.

== Dredging issues ==
The build-up of silt at the port, and the channel leading through Sligo Bay into the port, has been a persistent issue throughout the years. While training walls were put in place to help manage the movement of sediment, regular dredging is needed to maintain the depth required for commercial shipping. As of 2026, dredging of the channel last took place in 1998, while dredging at the berths last took place in 2010. In 2012, Sligo County Council sought to begin a major dredging programme at the harbour. While, in 2014, a foreshore licence for dredging was granted by the Department of the Environment, this project stalled later that year when funding could not be got to acquire a Dumping at Sea Licence from the Environmental Protection Agency. In 2022, it was reported that the volume of silt had nearly doubled since 2011, and that a new foreshore licence would have to be sought for any dredging. Between 2024 and 2025 there was an increase in traffic and calls for additional development from local representatives. The maximum deadweight of vessels entering the port has been reduced from 3,500 tonnes to 3,000 tonnes. A 2026 article in Afloat magazine reported that there were "currently no proposals to undertake any dredging of the north-west harbour" and noted that, without intervention, cargo vessels could be blocked from entering the harbour entirely.
