= Mining Heritage Trust of Ireland =

Industrial heritage organisation in Ireland

The Mining Heritage Trust of Ireland Ltd was a voluntary, not for profit organization to celebrate and promote awareness, appreciation and conservation of remains of what is arguably Ireland's oldest industry. This is an industry which commenced more than 7000 years ago during the Stone Age, and which has, right up to the present day, played an intimate and pivotal role in the evolution of human society, culture and economic activity in Ireland - a contribution most eloquently attested in the names given to the earliest phases of human cultural and societal evolution - the Stone, Copper, Bronze and Iron Ages.

The Trust undertook a range of activities throughout its existence; including field meetings, workshops and lectures and the recording of extant mining remains. It published a newsletter and an annual journal, The Journal of the Mining Heritage Trust of Ireland (ISSN 1649-0908).

The Trust was wound-up in 2019.
