= Rosses Point Peninsula =

Peninsula in Sligo Bay, Ireland

Coordinates: 54.357275°N 8.614894°W

An Ros
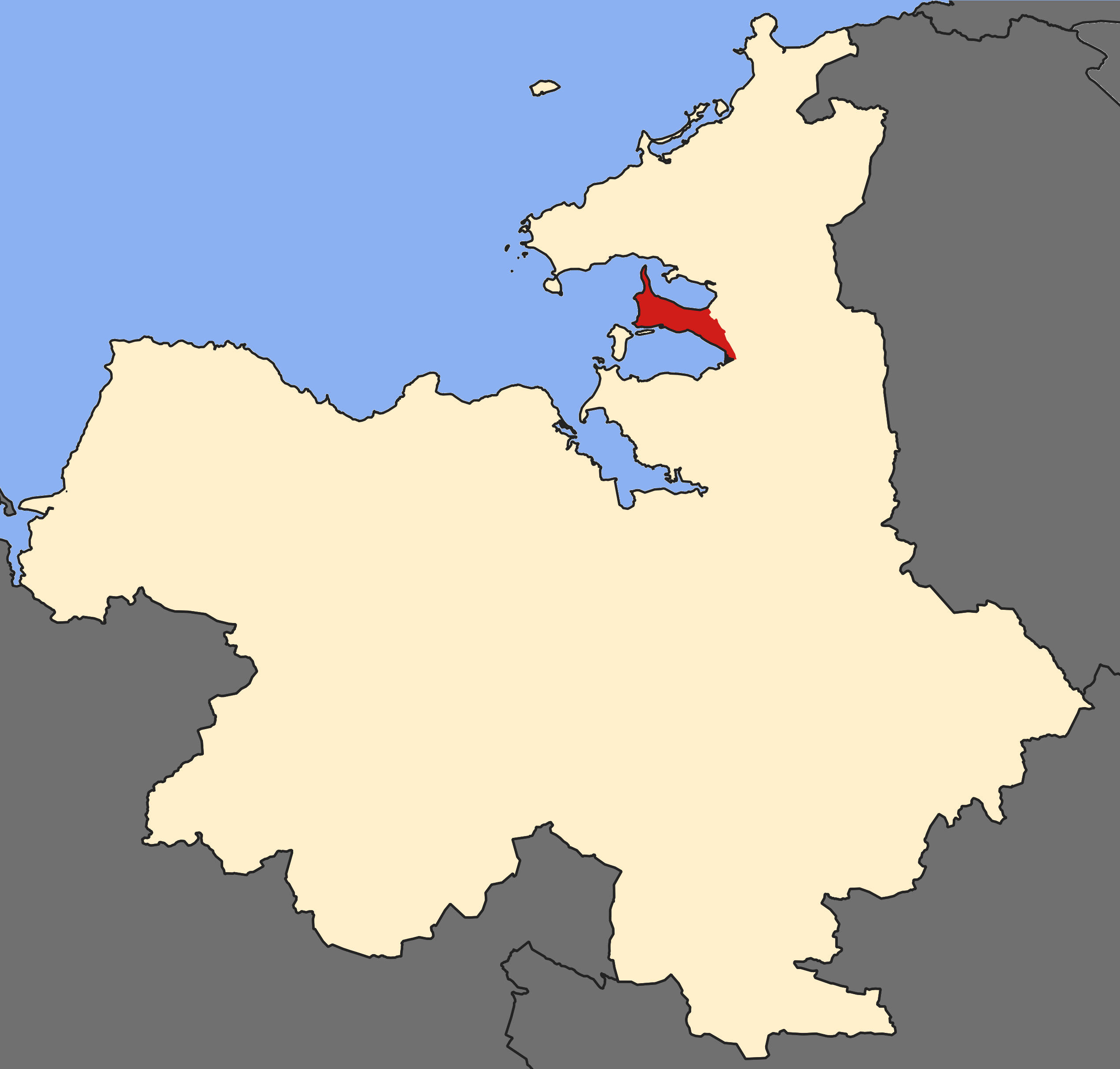
- Rosses Point Peninsula (Red) within County Sligo
- Interactive map of Rosses Point Peninsula

Geography
- Location: Ireland
- Adjacent to: Atlantic Ocean
- Area: 10 km^{2} (3.9 sq mi)

Administration
- Ireland
- County: Sligo

Demographics
- Population: 1,580 (2016)
- Pop. density: 158/km^{2} (409/sq mi)

The Rosses Point Peninsula (Irish: An Ros) is a small peninsula in the centre of Sligo Bay in County Sligo, Ireland. The peninsula shares its name with the village of Rosses Point, a popular seaside resort located on the peninsula's southern coast, roughly 7.5 km (5 mi) west of Sligo town.

Rosses Point has been inhabited for millennia. The earliest example of settlement on the peninsula was discovered in April 2020, when two local residents uncovered a Neolithic shell midden on their land. The peninsula also has a rich maritime tradition, and was commonly used as a rest-stop for sailors who were unfamiliar with the tides and were subsequently caught in the sands of Sligo Bay. By the 17th century, the area had become a hotbed for pirates and smugglers, who would harass Atlantic trading ships and loot the contents of ships that had been wrecked in Donegal Bay.

One such smuggler was "Black Jack", who used his wealth to build Elsinore House in the early 1800s, with cannons pointing out to sea set up in front of it. Despite its sordid history, Rosses Point developed into a Victorian era seaside resort. The area began to experience a swelling of seasonal visitors during the summer months, which is still the case to this day. In the late 19th century, Elsinore House came into the possession of the Middleton family, who were relatives of the Yeats family through their paternal grandfather. William and Jack Butler Yeats spent their childhood summers at the house, and the peninsula inspired many of their respective works. It was during these formative years that the young William developed his fascination with spiritualism and the paranormal. As a child, he believed the house was haunted by the ghosts of the smugglers and pirates who had frequented it, and would later write that there was nowhere in the world with more ghosts than Rosses Point.

The "Waiting on Shore" memorial was unveiled in 2002 to commemorate the people of Rosses Point who were drowned at sea throughout history. As an ode to its maritime history, the Wild Atlantic Shanty Festival is held every summer on Rosses Point.

== Places of interest ==
- County Sligo Golf Club
- Dead Man's Point
- Doonweelin Lough
- Elsinore House
- The Metal Man
- Oyster Island
- Radisson Blu Hotel & Spa, Sligo
- Rosses Point Beach
- Rosses Point Lighthouse
- Sea Fishing Sligo
- Sligo Yacht Club
- "Waiting on Shore" Memorial

== Gallery ==
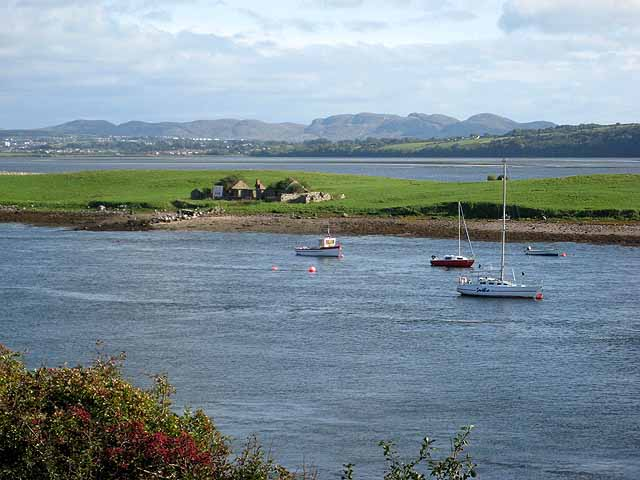
Oyster Island

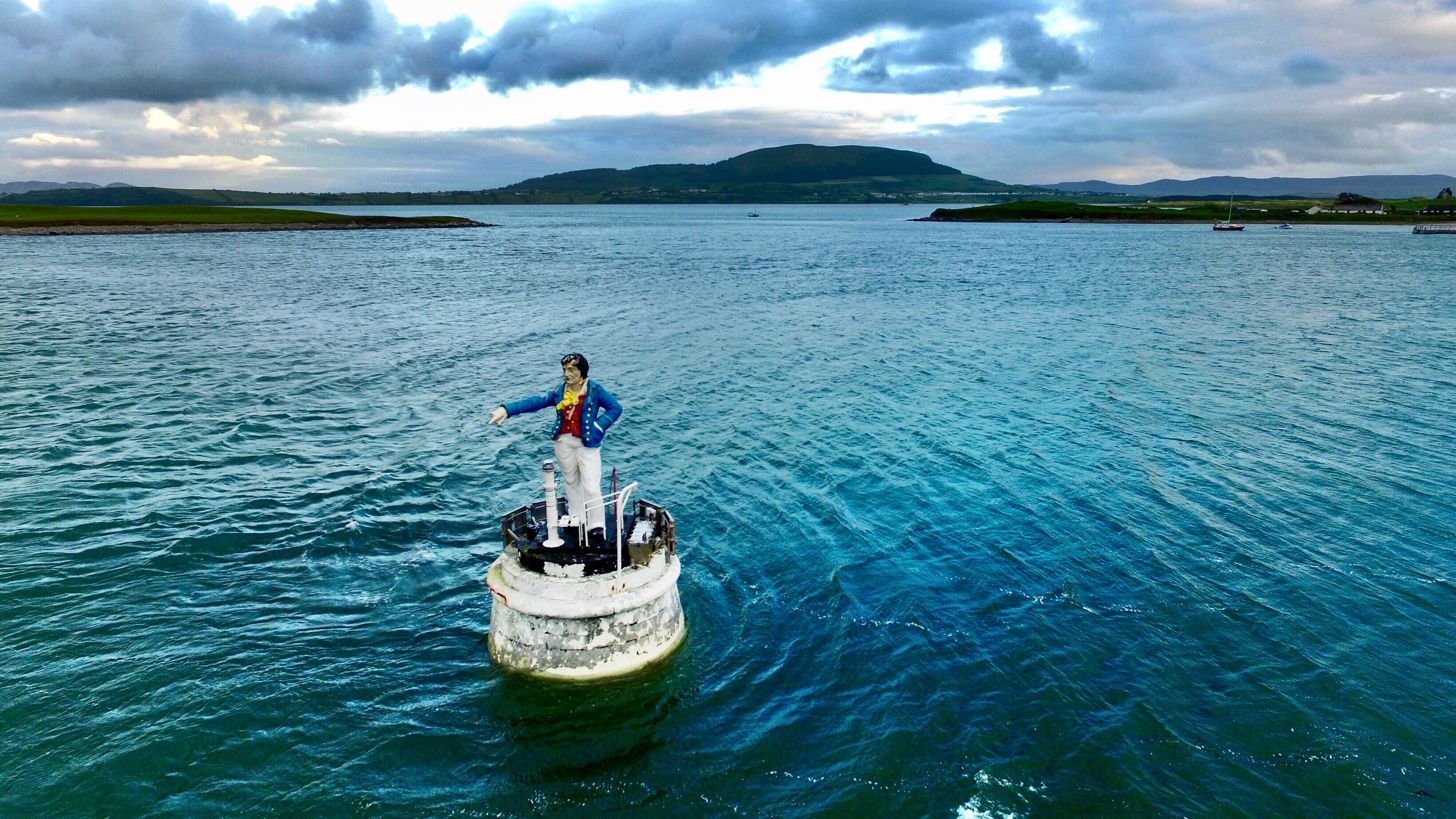
The Metal Man

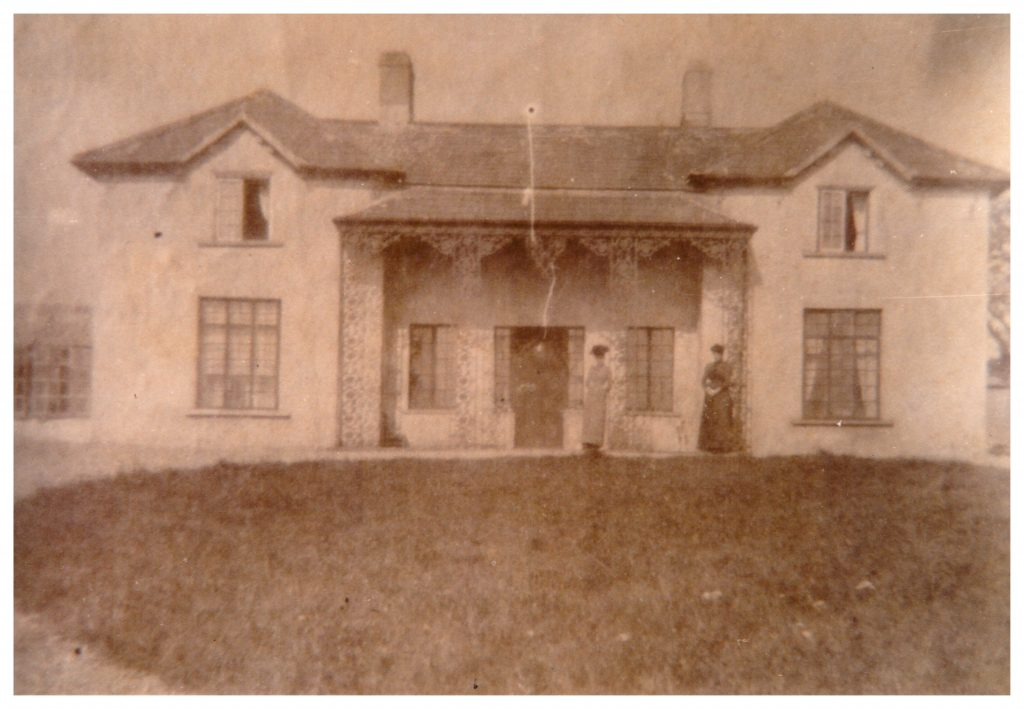
Elsinore House

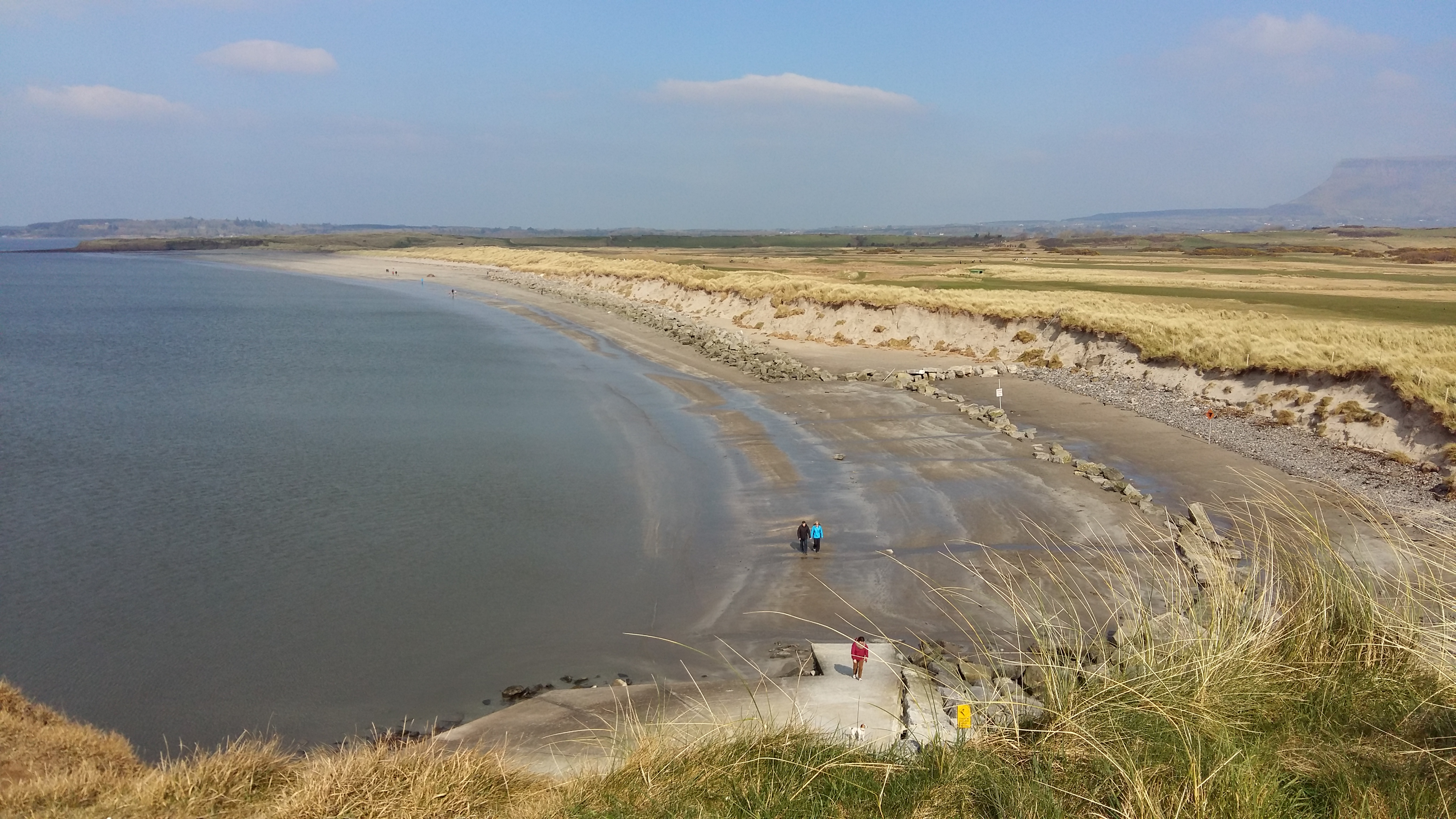
Rosses Point Beach

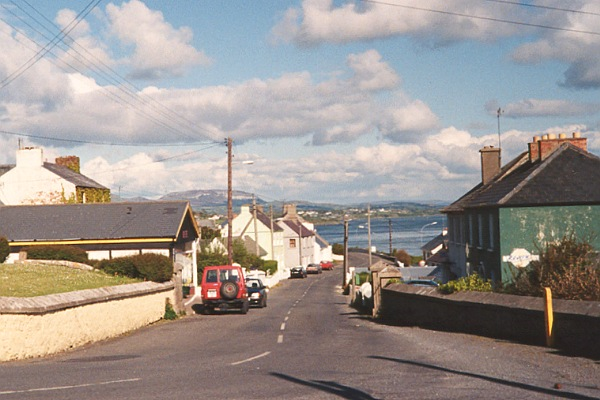
Rosses Point Village

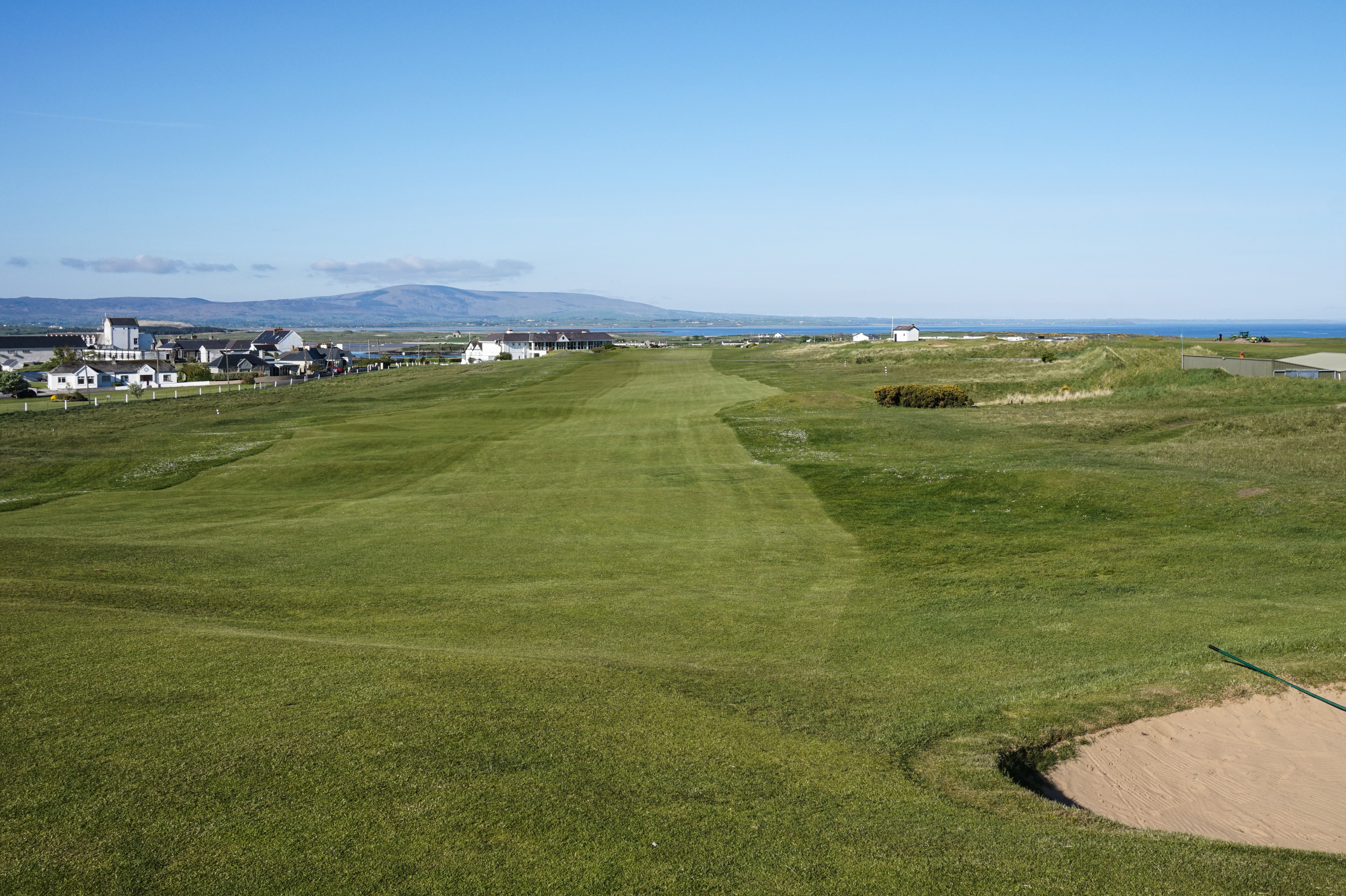
County Sligo Golf Club

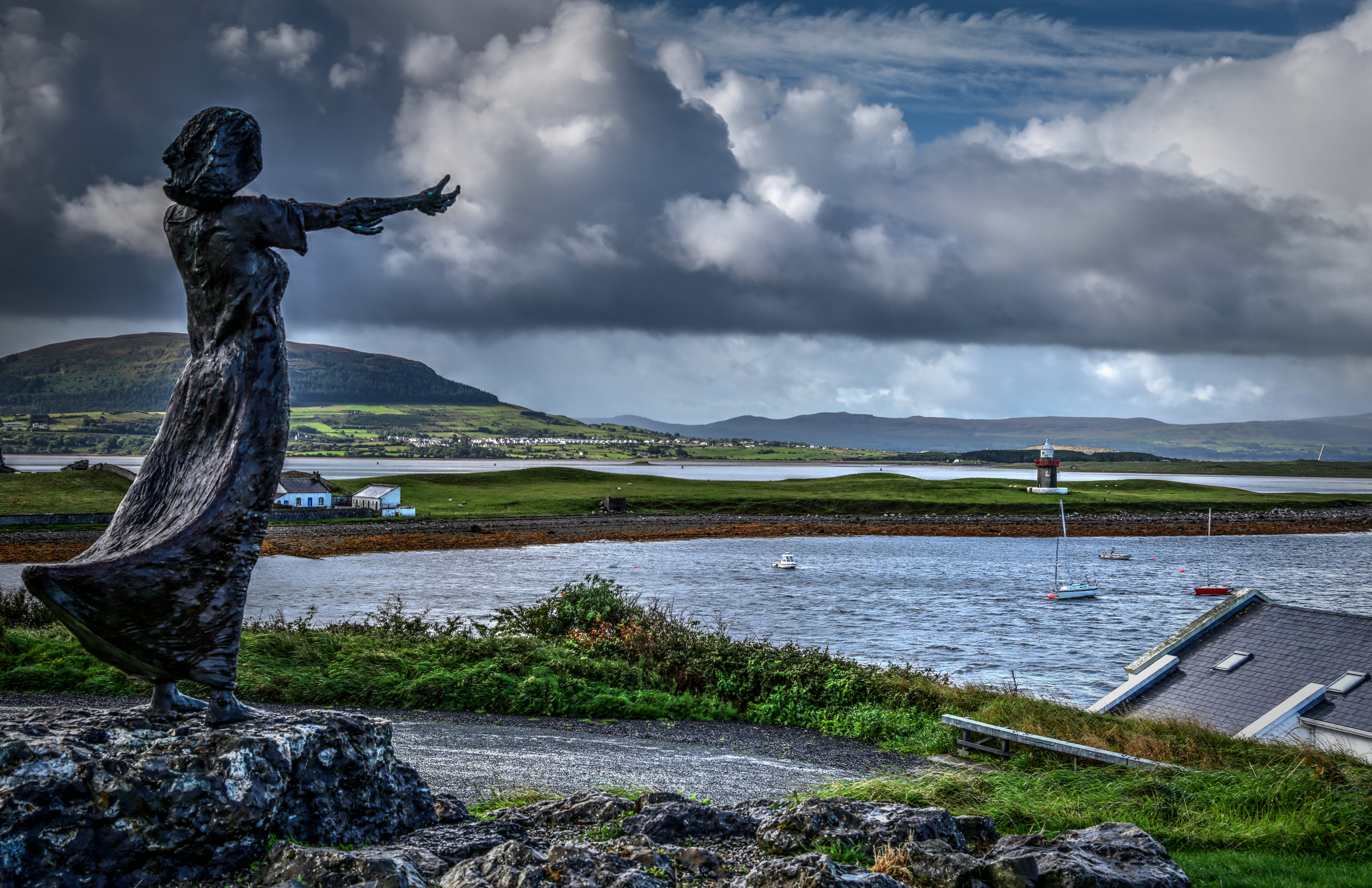
"Waiting on Shore"

== See also ==
- Carbury, County Sligo
- Coastal landforms of Ireland
