= List of people from Sligo =

Sligo, a town in the north-west of Ireland and county town of County Sligo, has produced noted artists, authors, entertainers, politicians and business-people.

== Music ==
- Perry Blake, singer and songwriter
- Tabby Callaghan, musician, The X Factor finalist
- Michael Coleman, musician
- Thomas Connellan, harper/composer
- William Connellan, harper/composer
- Kian Egan, member of Westlife
- Mark Feehily, member of Westlife
- Shane Filan, member of Westlife
- Tommy Fleming, singer
- Carmel Gunning, traditional Irish musician and singer
- Paddy Killoran, musician
- Naisse Mac Cithruadh, musician
- Maisie McDaniel, Irish country and showband singer
- James Morrison, musician
- Seamie O'Dowd, multi-instrumentalist and former member of Dervish
- Mary O'Hara, singer and harpist
- Lisa Stanley, Irish country singer/songwriter and daughter of Maisie McDaniel

== Arts and literature ==
- Leland Bardwell, poet, novelist and playwright
- Mary Colum, literary critic and author
- Owen Connellan, scholar, RIA
- Thady Connellan, scholar, published Irish-English dictionary 1814
- Neil Jordan, filmmaker and novelist; won an Academy Award for Best Original Screenplay for The Crying Game
- Brian Leyden, short story writer and novelist
- Dubhaltach Mac Fhirbhisigh, Irish scribe, author of the Great Book of Irish Genealogies
- Giolla Íosa Mór Mac Fir Bhisigh, historian, scribe compiler of the Yellow Book of Lecan, Great Book of Lecan
- Joe McGowan, author and historian
- Muireadhach Albanach Ó Dálaigh, Ollamh of poetry at Lissadell and crusader
- Tadhg Dall Ó hUiginn, file/poet, author of many poems in classical Dán Díreach style
- Jack Butler Yeats, painter and cartoonist
- William Butler Yeats, poet

== Historical and political figures ==
- St. Attracta of Killaraght, Irish ecclesiastic, 5th century, Saint
- Declan Bree, politician and social campaigner, former Labour TD for Sligo/Leitrim
- John J. Burns, mayor of Burlington, Vermont
- Frank Carty, Sligo IRA leader during the War of Independence and Irish Civil War; elected a TD for Sinn Féin and Fianna Fáil
- William Bourke Cockran, U.S. congressman
- Brigadier General Michael Corcoran, Union army general, American civil war
- Luke Duffy, trade unionist and politician
- Féchín of Fore, Irish ecclesiastic
- Michael Fenton, first Speaker of the Tasmanian House of Assembly.
- Patrick J. Hamrock, Colorado National Guardsman, participant in Sioux Wars and Ludlow Massacre
- John Jinks, politician
- Tuathal Mac Cormac Maelgarbh ua Cairbre, King of Ireland?, conqueror of Brega
- Chris MacManus, Sinn Féin MEP for Midlands–North-West Constituency
- Seán MacManus, former Sinn Féin Mayor of Sligo
- Cairbre Mac Néill, Irish king and warrior, son of Niall of the Nine Hostages
- Ray MacSharry, former government minister and EU Commissioner
- Linda Kearns MacWhinney Nurse, revolutionary and Fianna Fáil politician
- Constance Markievicz (née Gore-Booth), revolutionary; first elected female MP in the UK Parliament; first Irish female cabinet minister
- Alexander McCabe, revolutionary and Sinn Féin TD, later a member of Cumann na nGaedheal
- Martin Moffat, soldier, recipient of the Victoria Cross
- Nath í of Achad an Rí, 6th century Irish ecclesiastic
- Fearghal Ó Gadhra, Chief of Coolavin, patron of the Annals of the Four Masters
- Ambrosio O'Higgins, 1st Marquess of Osorno, Governor of Chile and Viceroy of Peru during the Spanish domination of the Americas
- Bernardo O'Higgins, Liberator of Chile
- William Partridge, trade unionist, revolutionary, leader of Irish Citizen Army, fought during Easter Rising
- Liam Pilkington, IRA commander, 3rd western division, 1921-23. Anti-treaty IRA
- Martin Savage, Irish Republican
- Brian Luighnech Ua Conchobhair, King of Cairbre Drom Cliabh, ancestor of the Ó Conchobar Sligigh, son of Toirdealbhach Mór Ó Conchobar, High King of Ireland 1106-1156

== Medicine and science ==
- William Cunningham Blest, creator of the first Chilean School of Medicine
- Sir George Stokes, 1st Baronet, mathematician and physicist

== Sports ==
- Jonathan Dolan, Irish badminton player
- Sean Fallon, former Republic of Ireland and Celtic F.C. footballer
- Mickey Kearins GAA
- Paul McGee, Sligo Rovers F.C. and Ireland international soccer player
- Mona McSharry swimmer
- Barnes Murphy GAA
- Christopher O'Donnell, Ireland International track and field sprinter
- Eamonn O'Hara GAA
- Mark Scanlon, cyclist
- Brother Walfrid (aka Andrew Kerins), Marist Brother, and founder of Celtic F.C. in Glasgow

== Film and entertainment ==
- Roger Clark, voice actor, portrayed Arthur Morgan in Red Dead Redemption 2
- Pauline Flanagan, film and television actress
- Scott Fredericks, film and television actor, radio producer
- Neil Jordan, director of The Crying Game, Interview with the Vampire, Michael Collins
- Eugene Lambert, puppeteer and children's entertainer
- Pauline McLynn, actress, Mrs Doyle in the sitcom Father Ted
- Noelle Middleton, film and television actress
- Lola Montez, actress, exotic dancer, courtesan and the mistress of King Ludwig I of Bavaria
- Joan O'Hara, film and television actress
- Dearbhla Walsh, film and TV director
- Olga Wehrly, actor

== Business ==
- Niall FitzGerald, chairman of Reuters Group plc; former chairman and CEO of Unilever plc
- Dermot Mannion, CEO of Aer Lingus

== See also ==
- Category:People from County Sligo
