= Creevykeel Court Tomb =

Megalithic tomb in County Sligo, Ireland

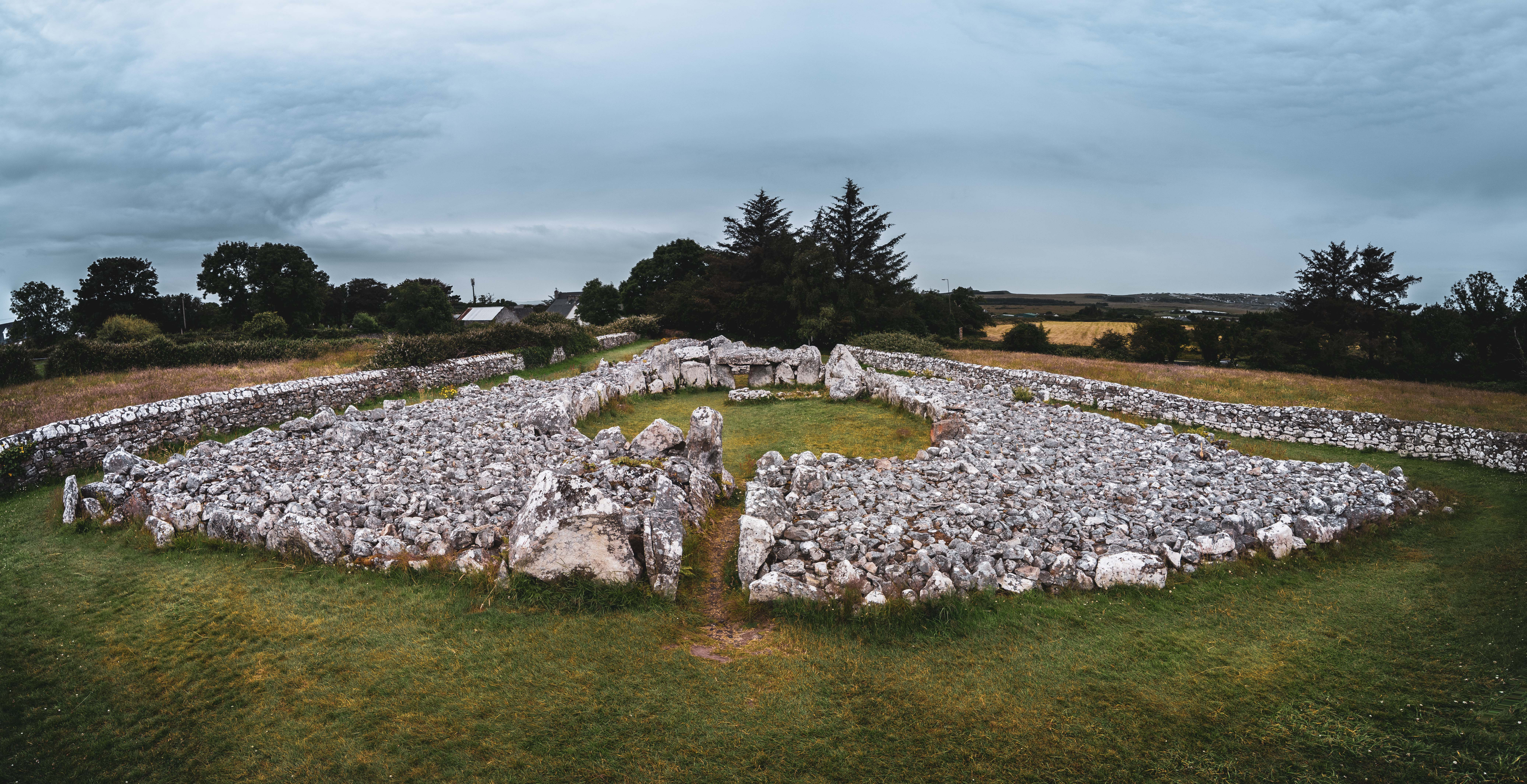
- The site in 2019
- Interactive map of Creevykeel Court Tomb
- 54.4387°N 8.4335°W
- Location: County Sligo, Ireland

History
- Built: c. 3500 BC

Site notes
- Material: Sandstone

Creevykeel Court Tomb (Irish: Tuama Cúirte na Craobhaí Caoile) is one of the finest examples of a court tomb remaining in Ireland. The monument is located beside the N15 Donegal Town to Sligo road, 50 metres north of Creevykeel cross-roads, close to the village of Cliffoney in the north of County Sligo. The original name for the Creevykeel (An Chraobhaigh Chaol) monument is Caiseal an Bhaoisgin, the Fort of Bhaoisgin, Tobar an Bhaoisgin being the name of the well near the cairn. A second megalithic monument existed 300 metres to the north, but it was demolished around 1890.

== The Monument ==
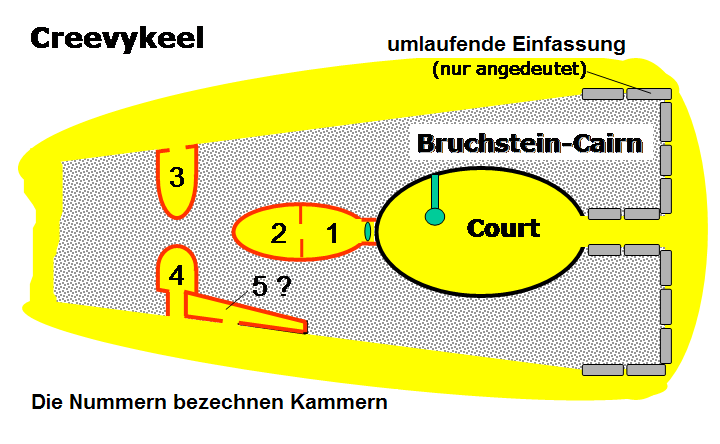
Plan of the Creevykeel site

The building of the tomb dates back to the Neolithic Period, 4000–2500 BC, when waves of colonising farmers migrated to Ireland from the continent. The Creevykeel Court Tomb is one of five megalithic monuments in the area. Creevykeel has not been dated using modern scientific methods, and is estimated to date from around 3500 BC with a long span of use and re-use.

The monument consists of a long, trapezoid-shaped cairn of stones which measures 55.5 meters along its east - west axis, 25 meters at the wider eastern facade, and 10 meters wide at the western end or tail of the cairn. The stones used to construct the monument are a hard local sandstone with a bluish tint.

The cairn encloses an oval-shaped full court 15 by 9 meters with an entrance passage through the east side. The entrance to the main chamber is located at the centre of an imposing megalithic facade on the west side of the court. The chamber is made up of two large compartments divided by a pair of jambs, which presumably supported an inner lintel like those at Shawley and Croaghbeg in County Donegal in Ulster.

Evidence of large corbel slabs used for roofing the structure survives in the inner chamber. In the west end of cairn three subsidiary chambers were built into the body of the monument, which have been described as being small passage-graves. However they seem to date from a later neolithic addition to the original monument.

== Archaeology ==
Creevykeel is widely considered to be one of the finest and best-preserved examples of an Irish court tomb.

=== Excavations in 1935 ===
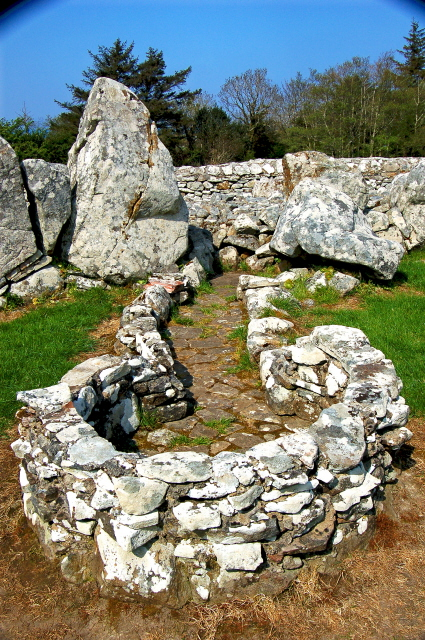
The Early Christian structure within the court at Creevykeel

The Creevykeel Court Tomb was excavated from 25 July to 4 September in 1935 by the fourth Harvard Archaeological Mission, an American collaboration with the Irish Free State Government, which were the first modern scientific excavations to take place in Ireland. The director of the excavation was Hugh Hencken, the Curator of European Archaeology at the Peabody Museum in Harvard. Twenty-seven workers were involved in the dig, many being local labourers hired under an innovative State employment scheme.

The cairn material was removed entirely, leaving the large megalithic boulders in their original positions. The cairn was replaced again after the excavation had been completed. The excavators found that the large structural chunks of sandstone were resting on the old ground surface, rather than being placed in sockets. In many cases the stones had sunk into the soil.

A section of cobbled and paved surface dating to the neolithic was found to cover the western end of the court. A large, shallow pit, 25cm deep and filled with sand was found under the cobbles. Evidence of three fires was uncovered within the western end of the court area, beneath the cobbles.

The entrance to the double chamber is flanked by four huge megalithic orthostats, averaging two meters in height. The chamber is accessed by an opening 80 cm wide, flanked by two massive flat slabs. The chamber is nine meters long and three meters wide, divided by a pair of orthostats. Hencken termed the outer chamber C1 and the inner chamber C2.

The huge lintel was found lying within the chamber and had to be moved to allow excavation. Within the chamber, a polished stone axe was discovered buried between the twin orthostats dividing the chamber. Three pits within the chamber contained small amounts of cremated bone, which Hencken thought must be symbolic deposits.

"In small pits in the megalithic stratum were also four cremated burials. This term must be qualified, however, for though they seemed undisturbed, none consisted of more than a very few tiny chips of bone. These were so small and burned that it was impossible even to say that they were human."

=== Finds ===
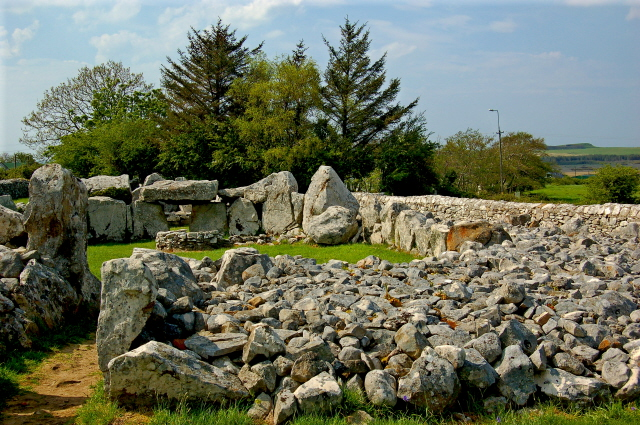
The cairn materials were removed and replaced during excavation and site survey

A large number of items from both the neolithic and early Christian periods were discovered.

Two polished stone axe heads were found, one buried between the jambs dividing the main chamber; the other, a fine polished diorite example was found at the inner entrance of the court, again between two jambs. Other finds from the main chamber included a large flint knife, about 13 cm long, a lozenge-shaped arrow head made from limestone, pot sherds, some quartz crystals, and flint scrapers.

The remains of eight neolithic pots, including an example of a cardial ware vessel were found in sub chamber B on the north side of the western end of the cairn.

=== Early Christian occupation ===
A grain-drying kiln gating from the Early Christian period was discovered east of and close to the entrance to the neolithic chamber. This is a circular structure with a hearth attached on the west side. A flue structure or vent extends north from the circular structure to the neolithic facade, where an orthostat from the court was removed and rolled over to make an opening. A number of drilled holes on the adjoining orthostat may have been used to attach some kind of leather roof used to cover the vent.

"Perhaps the most intriguing aspect of Creevykeel is the early Christian construction found in the northwestern part of the court, built when the original Late Neolithic – Early Bronze Age cairn was long derelict."

The Early Christian structure contained a mixture of charcoal, ashes and burnt soil. The three stones flanking the hearth were severely burnt. A large chunk of iron slag was found within the structure, and several more lumps of slag were found around the structure.

The chamber had been cleared out in recent times and contained a modern filling, near the bottom of which were foetal bones of at least two individuals, representing about the seventh month of foetal life. They were associated with the skeleton of a cat, a few bones of pig, ox and frog, and broken china.

Within the chamber of the monument, Hencken uncovered a very large hearth or fire pit lined with flat flags. The hearth contained the bones of ox, sheep, pig, dog and fish as well as periwinkle and limpet shells. A large stake hole may have been used to suspend cooking implements over the fire. Other finds from later times included two iron knives. A more substantial smelting pit or blast furnace was found on the north side of the chamber. The east side of this fire pit was lined with stake holes, which Hencken thought were part of a wattle structure presumably used as a wind-break.

"Plainly Chambers CI and C2 were used as a dwelling in Early Christian times in connection with the contemporary traces in the court. The evidence of intense burning probably indicates that CI had by that time lost at least part of its roof. C2 perhaps was still roofed with stone at this time, for, while there are four little hearths in it, there is nothing like the evidence of burning that there is in CI."

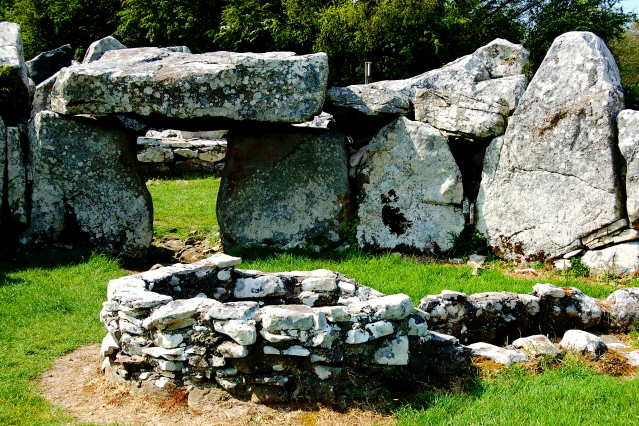
The early Christian smelting chamber in the court at Creevykeel

=== Interpretation ===
According to analysis, the monument appears to have been built in at least three phases, with an open court facing to the east belonging to phase one, including the entrance flanked by large megalithic blocks with a massive triangular lintel stone. Phase two saw the court enclosed to become a contained area. A new entrance was added on the east side of the court, which is not in line with the axis of the main chamber. During a third phase the cairn was lengthened and widened by as much as two meters on the sides and six meters at the eastern end. The old facade can still be seen as a line of boulders within the cairn.

The large lintel stone, which was found lying within the chamber, originally stood upright creating an imposing monumental facade. Hencken, did not believe the accounts of local residents, who informed him the stone had stood upright until it was pushed over by three locals within living memory. He had the massive lintel stone lifted and placed horizontally over the door jambs in its current position in order to excavate the chamber. However, a watercolour of the monument painted by William Wakeman in August 1880 shows the lintel standing upright over the entrance. The caption under Wakeman's sketch noted that the top of the lintel was 9 feet above the chamber floor.

=== Folklore ===
"The writer also heard the following stories from Mr. Edward Connelly, who was then a man of about 80, and who lived near the cairn. He said that the replaced lintel had originally stood erect on one edge upon its supporting uprights instead of lying flat, and that under it on the northern side there was another smaller stone between it and the jamb stone of the entrance. This was perhaps the broken stone that was moved during the excavation. Though the story that this stone over the entrance from the court into Chamber CI once stood erect like a pediment sounds very improbable, it is generally believed in the district, and it was also told by Mr. John Hannon of Creevykeel. Mr. Connelly said that "the prophecy of the stone," which he had heard since he was a boy long before it fell, was that it would be thrown down "by three brothers of the one name." About thirty years ago three brothers upset the stone. It is incidentally worth mentioning that, had the stone ever stood erect, it could have been pushed over by three men, but certainly not if it lay flat as we replaced it."

The chamber at Creevykeel was used as a still house for the distilling of the illegal spirit, poteen. This may account for local stories told by locals, who reported seeing blue lights coming out of the monument. The site is associated with a white hare. The bones of the two infant children found within the Early Christian structure probably indicate that the monument was used briefly as a burial ground for unbaptised children.
