= Thalassa Cruso =

Presenter and author

- Born: January 7, 1909; London
- Died: June 11, 1997 (aged 88); Massachusetts
- Occupation(s): Presenter writer
- Known for: Horticulture; Archaeology
- Spouse: Hugh O'Neill Hencken

Thalassa Cruso Hencken (born Mary Thalassa Alford Cruso; January 7, 1909 – June 11, 1997) was a British-born presenter and author on horticulture. Through her appearance on The Tonight Show, as well as her gardening show on PBS, Making Things Grow, she became known to a wide audience and earned the reputation as "The Julia Child of Horticulture."

== Career ==
Born in Kensington, London in 1909 to Henry and Mildred Cruso, she was raised mostly in Surrey. Her parents were devoted hobby gardeners and passed on a keen interest in gardening and working outdoors to their daughter. She decided to study archaeology after finishing secondary school. Cruso attended the London School of Economics and finished a qualification in anthropology in 1931. Cruso then began working at the Museum of London where she became Assistant to Director Mortimer Wheeler in the costume collection. She gave lectures in 1933 and 1934 on the evolution of costumes. She led the excavation of an Iron Age hill fort on Bredon Hill, Worcestershire. In the summer of 1934 she was sent to Ireland to attend a dig there where Cruso met American archaeologist Hugh O'Neill Hencken. They married in 1935 and Cruso assisted him on the last year of the Harvard Irish Mission before returning to the United States with him. They lived in Boston where they had three daughters.

During a visit to the UK, Cruso came up with the idea of a gardening show, Making Things Grow, which ran on PBS from 1966 to 1969. Cruso also made regular appearances on The Tonight Show with Johnny Carson, and followed that with a household show called Making Things Work. Cruso also wrote multiple books, as well as a column for the Boston Globe for 22 years. She also wrote for Country Journal, McCall's and Horticulture. In her later life she lived in Marion, Massachusetts. Cruso died in 1997 at the Alzheimer's Center at Newton-Wellesley Hospital in Wellesley, Massachusetts.

== Bibliography ==
- Making Things Grow (1969)
- A Small City Garden (1972)
- To Everything There Is a Season (1973)
- Making Things Grow Outdoors (1974)
- The Cape Cod Dunes (1974)
- Making Vegetables Grow (1975)
