= Cliffoney =

Cliffoney Cliafuine
- Village
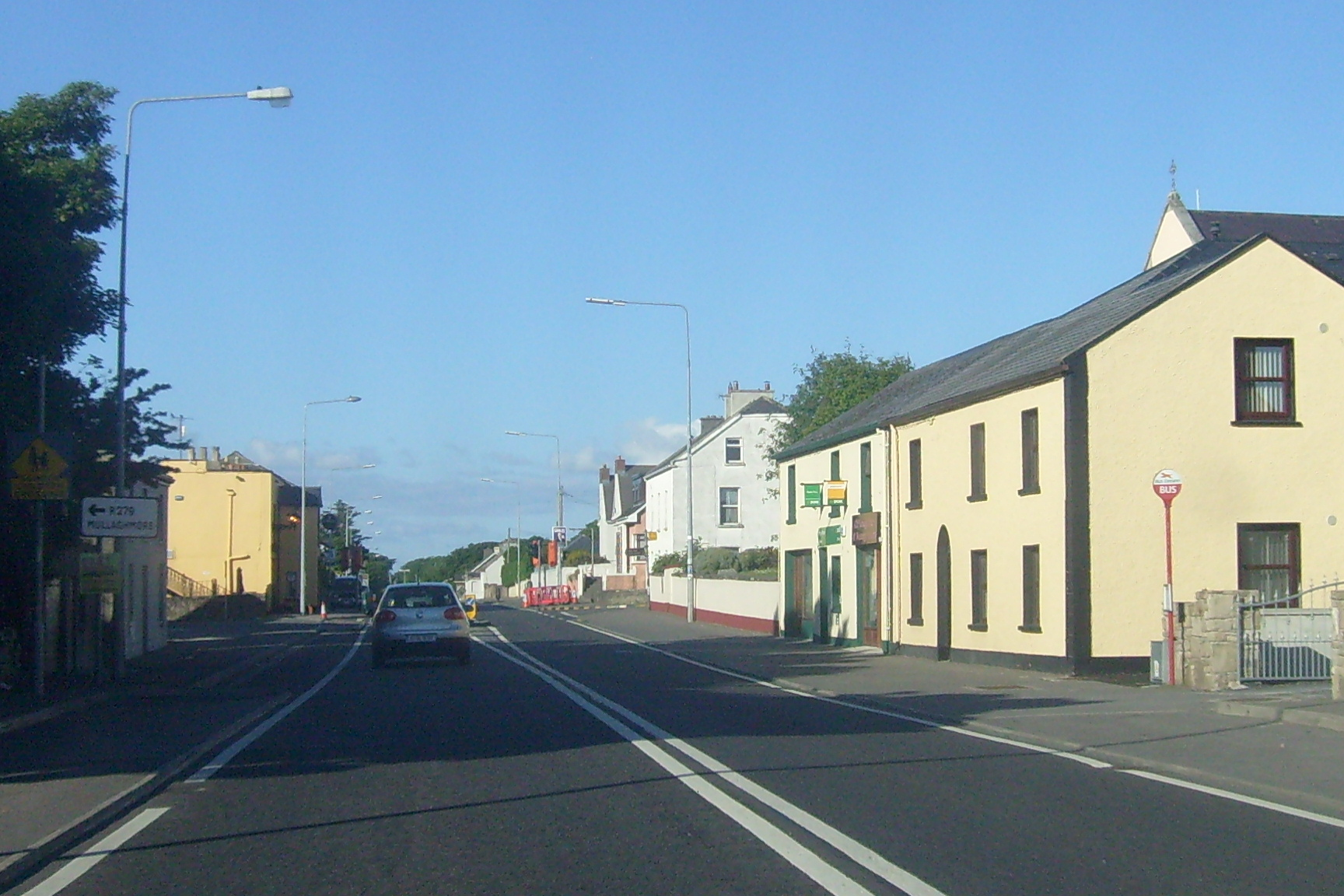
- Cliffoney along the N15 road (south side)

- Location in Ireland
- Coordinates: 54.430°N 8.455°W
- Country: Ireland
- Province: Connacht
- County: County Sligo
- Barony: Carbury
- Catholic diocese: Elphin
- Elevation: 30 m (98 ft)

Population (2022)
  - Total: 521
- Irish Grid Reference: G705540

Cliffoney, officially Cliffony (Irish: Cliafuine (Cliathmhuine), meaning 'hurdled thicket'), is a village in the north of County Sligo in the west of Ireland. It lies on the N15 national route at its junction with the R279. It is approximately three kilometres from Mullaghmore.

Cliffoney has historical connections to the 3rd Viscount Palmerston, prime minister of the United Kingdom in the mid-nineteenth century, and Father Michael O'Flanagan, vice-president and later president of Sinn Féin, who was known as 'the Republican Priest'. Brigid MacGonigal, mother of Harry Clarke, was a native of Cliffoney.

There are several megalithic monuments close to the village, including Creevykeel Court Tomb. There are also several ringforts and cashels in the area. Saint Brigit's Well has a cross-slab, probably dating to the eighth century, with a swastika carved in the top of the cross.

== History ==
The oldest structures in Cliffoney are the five megalithic tombs close to the village in the townlands of Creevykeel, Creevymore and Cartronplank. Creevykeel Court Tomb, considered one of the finest examples of its kind in Ireland, was excavated by the Harvard Archaeological Mission in 1935. A second monument close to Creevykeel was destroyed completely by 1890. The chamber and back-stone of Cartronplank court tomb still survives, located on a private farm. The other two monuments are overgrown and on private land.

The Cliffoney megaliths were visited by a number of antiquarians and researchers, and were illustrated by William Wakeman in 1880. Creevykeel is in state care and is maintained by the Office of Public Works. The other sites are on private property.

=== Saint Bridget's Well and Cross ===
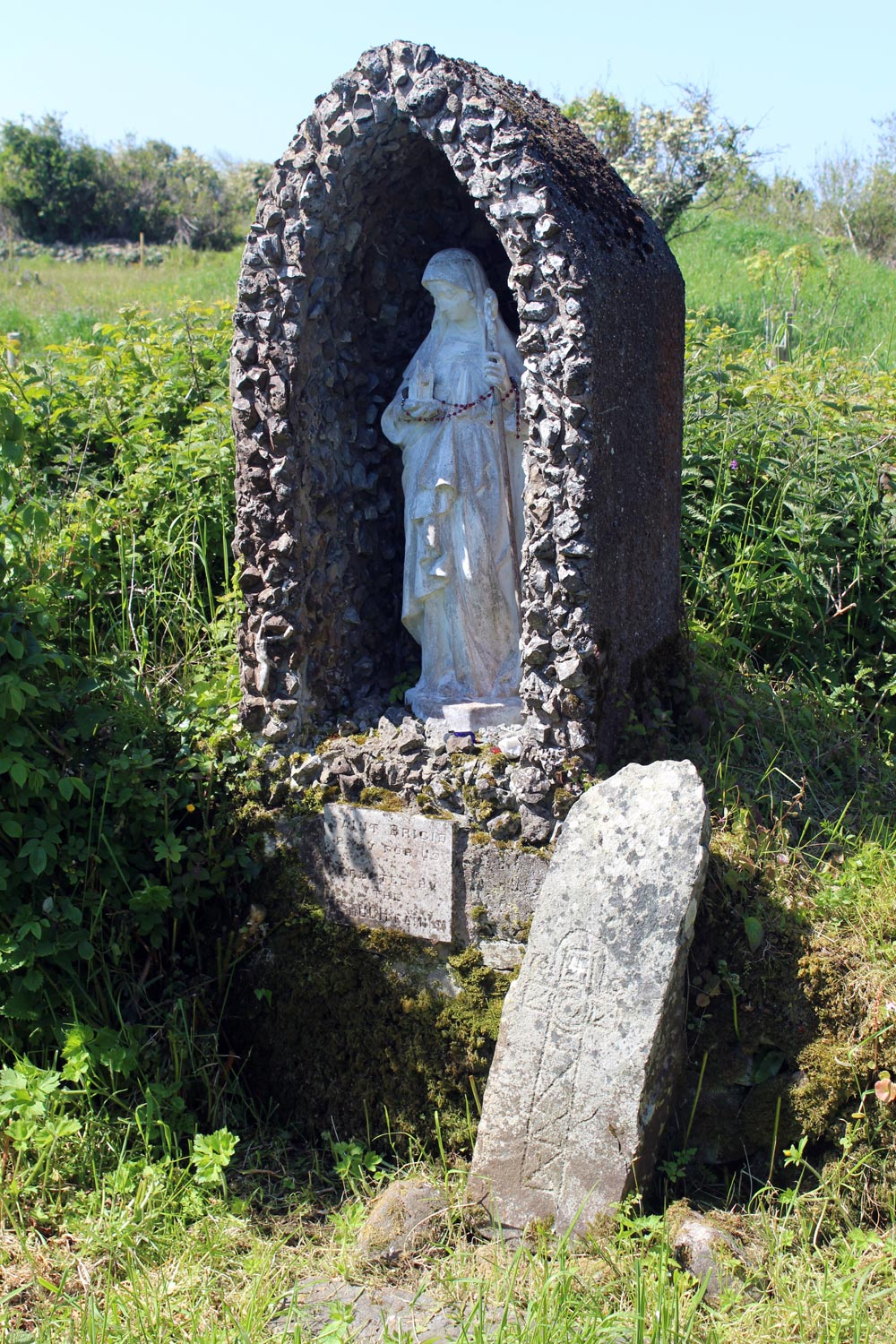
A modern statue and ancient cross-slab at Saint Bridget's Well, close to Cliffoney village

A holy well associated with Saint Bridget is located on private land close to the village of Cliffoney. The well is located within a large ringfort some 40 meters in diameter which is mostly ploughed out on the south side, but is in good condition on the north side. Beside the well is an early Christian cross-slab known as the Cliffoney Cross, thought to date to the eighth century and contemporary with the many carved slabs on Inishmurray. The well was the site of an ancient cattle fair held annually on 1 February. A shrine with a statue of Saint Bridget was erected in the 1950s.

St Brigid's Well is situated in Mrs Timoney's field about four hundred yards from the main road in the vicinity of Cliffoney. It was called St Brigid's Well, because when she was travelling through Connaught she visited and blessed it.

In its present state it is difficult to locate it, because it is surrounded by briars. In olden days the people used to come from every district and visit it. They used to go round the Well and said the following prayers Our Father and three Hail Marys.

=== Lord Palmerston ===
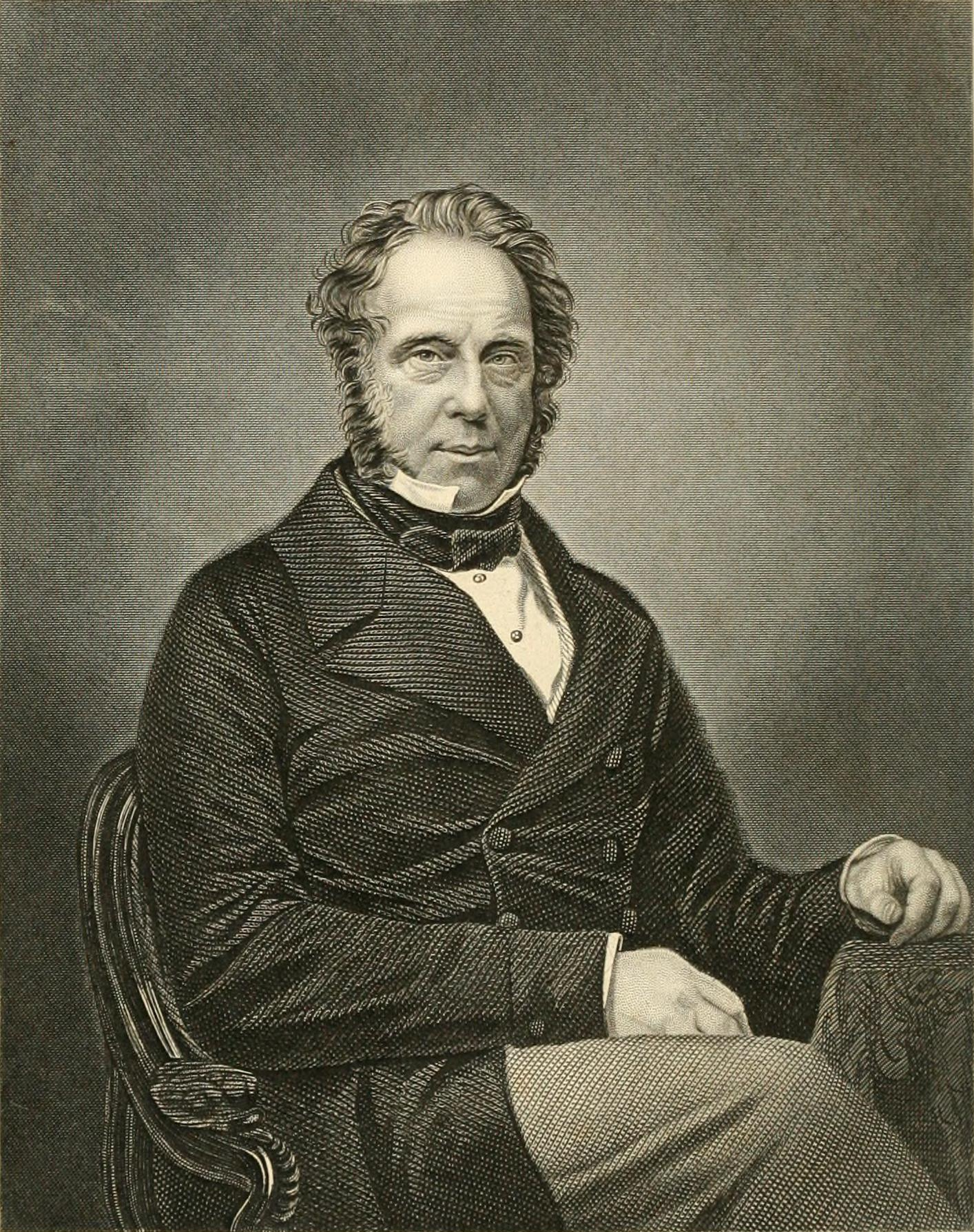
The 3rd Viscount Palmerston in an engraving dated to the 1850s

The lands around Cliffoney were granted to James Byrne after the Cromwellian conquests in the mid-1600s. After 1690 the lands were granted to Sir John Temple. The title Viscount Palmerston was created for the Temple family in 1723. The Palmerston family were absentee landlords, leaving the management of their estates to middlemen. The 2nd Viscount Palmerston reportedly "contributed generously to local charities in Romsey, but he had no feelings of obligation towards his Irish tenants, and never invested any money in his lands in North Sligo".

Upon the sudden death of the second Viscount in April 1802, the family's North Sligo estates were inherited by his oldest son, Henry John Temple, who then became the 3rd Viscount Palmerston. The young Lord Palmerston visited his County Sligo estates, consisting of some 10,000 acres, for the first time in 1808.

He found a destitute tenantry renting small plots from middlemen, who set the land to tenants in rundale, a system of communal occupation under which an individual tenant might from time to time hold many tiny detached plots. In the early nineteenth century huge tracts of Ahamlish were destroyed by shifting sands, but Palmerston sought to bring the bogs there, as well as the sands ruined by sand, into cultivation.

Palmerston began a building programme, renovating the old Market House which became a hotel, The Cliffoney Inn, in 1820. A boys school was built next door in 1824 and a girls school at the north end of the village in 1826, replacing the old hedge school in Ahamlish. Palmerston immediately clashed with the local Catholic priest, Fr. John McHugh, the priest forbidding children attending either school unless a Catholic teacher was employed.

In further improvements, Alexander Nimmo was engaged to construct a pier in Mullaghmore. While Nimmo was in Cliffoney he designed and constructed apartments for Palmerston over an extension at the back of The Cliffoney Inn. "Nimmo, the designer of Mullaghmore Harbour supervised extensive renovations to the Inn in 1826 at the cost of £385. 15s. 0d. The refurbishment included provision of a stone staircase, yard, stables and gateway".

The Roman Catholic church of Saint Molaise was completed and opened by 1828, slightly ahead of Catholic Emancipation. It replaced an earlier structure called Tempeall Bui, located behind the current village hall and close to Saint Bridget's Well, probably demolished and reused in the new buildings.

"In the build up to Catholic Emancipation, in February 1828, religious tensions caused a riot in Cliffoney with extra police required to calm the 239 strong crowd". A parochial house called Palmerston Glebe was built in Creevymore for the use of the Catholic priests, with four acres of land attached. Lord Palmerston hired an estate manager named John Lynch to oversee drainage and reclamation projects and built a two-story house called Rundale Cottage. In the 1830s a tree nursery was established at Rundale.

=== Fr. Michael O'Flanagan ===
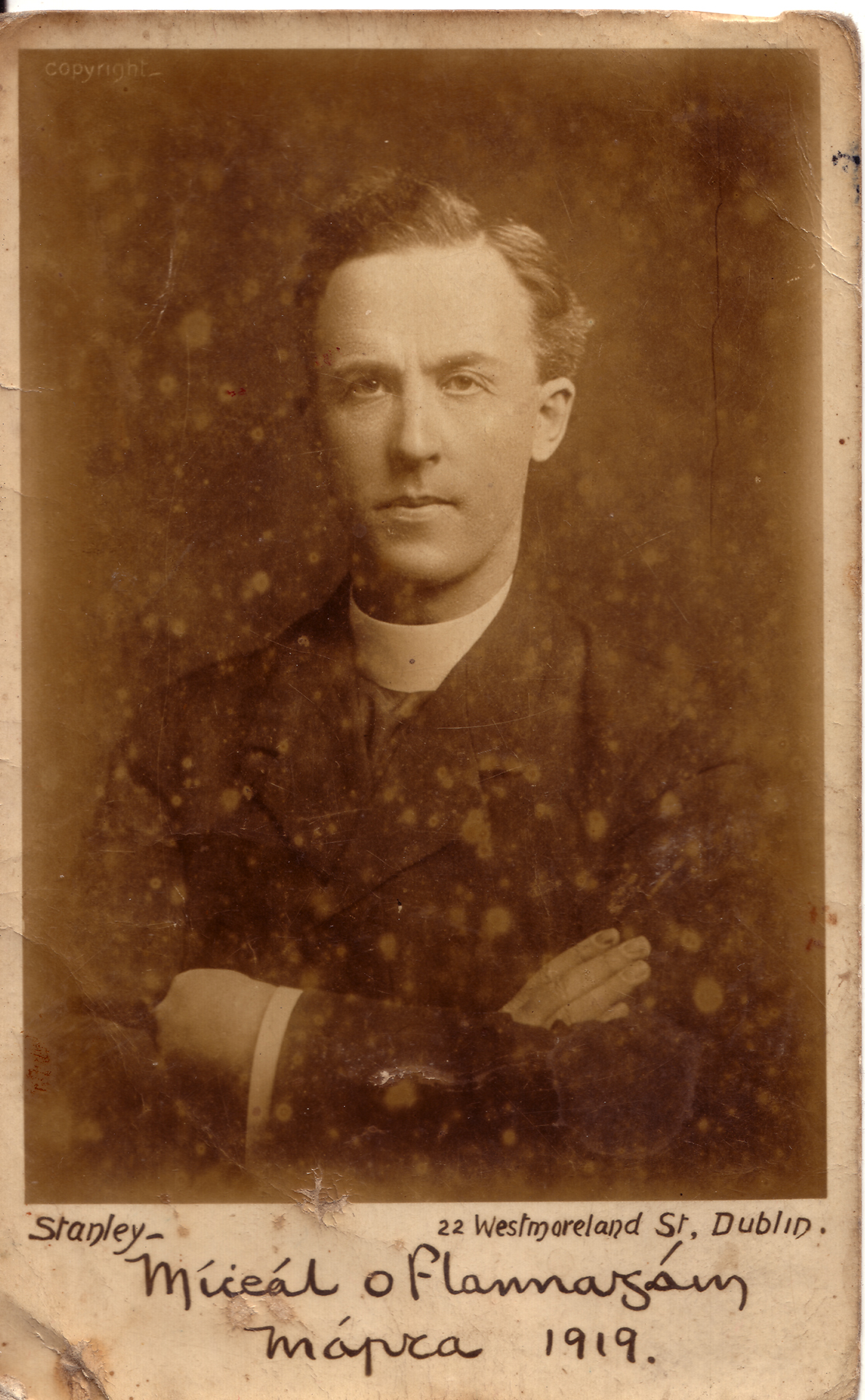
Fr. Michael O'Flanagan, vice-president of Sinn Féin, 1919

Fr. Michael O'Flanagan was sent to Cliffoney at the end of July 1914, shortly before the start of WW1. O'Flanagan, a widely travelled curate with strong nationalist, socialist and republican ideals, may have been moved by Bishop Bernard Coyne for his support of the Sligo Dock Strike in May 1913. One of O'Flanagan's first initiatives was to write to Colonel Ashley of Classiebawn Castle, and he secured the old school house as a community hall for the villagers.

Upon discovering social inequality in land redistribution, he led the villagers on a campaign against the Congested Districts Board to secure rights to cut turf on the Cloonerco Bogs adjacent to Cliffoney. This action, which began on 29 June 1915 became known as the Cloonerco Bog Fight. The case simmered on all summer, and the villagers harvested large quantities of turf which was distributed throughout the locality. Eventually the case was settled in favour of the people of Cliffoney.

O'Flanagan was invited to attend the funeral of veteran Fenian Jeremiah O'Donovan Rossa in August 1915. He gave a passionate speech at the Reception of Remains in City Hall, where he was photographed with Tom Clarke, Mary Jane and Eileen O'Donovan Rossa. At the graveside O'Flanagan recited the funeral prayers in Irish before his friend Padraig Pearse made his incendiary speech.

In October O'Flanagan attended a tillage meeting held in Sligo Courthouse, where T. W. Russell was campaigning on behalf of the British Government, for increased tillage production to aid the war effort. When a motion to that effect was proposed, O'Flanagan objected and proposed a counter-motion, advising the people to "ignore the Board of Agriculture and adopt their own remedy...... They should 'Stick to the oats.' This call has ever since been associated with the curate of Cliffoney."

O’Flanagan’s speech ended with a rousing call: ‘The famine of 1847 would never have been written across the pages of history if the men of that day were men enough to risk death rather than part with their oat crop. Let each farmer keep at least as much oats on hand to carry himself and his family through in case of necessity till next years harvest.

The speech was widely reported in the newspapers, and within days O'Flanagan was removed from Cliffoney by Bishop Coyne. In response, on 17 October the villagers of Cliffoney locked the door of St. Molaise's church, and refused to allow a replacement to enter, demanding instead that O'Flanagan be sent back to Cliffoney. The standoff, which became known as the "Cliffoney Rebellion" was to last for ten weeks. The people of Cliffoney knelt on the ground outside the locked church and said the Rosary for the return of O'Flanagan. The villagers marched 15 miles into Sligo to have an audience with the Bishop, but he refused to meet them. They also sent a petition to the Pope which was unsuccessful. Eventually the church was re-opened on Christmas Eve, 1915.

An unfinished memoir, written by O'Flanagan in 1920, describes his version of the events that took place during his time in Cliffoney. The memoir was published as "From Cliffoney to Crosna" in 2016 by the Fr. O'Flanagan Memorial Group in Cliffoney.

=== Cliffoney Volunteers ===
A company of Volunteers was set up in Cliffoney with the guidance of Fr. O'Flanagan and Alec McCabe.

In November, 1915 I was introduced, with a few other men in the district, into the I.R.B. (Irish Republican Brotherhood) by the late William Gilmartin and Alec McCabe, then a National Teacher in Sligo. The I.R.B. Circle at that time consisted of eight members and was later increased to twelve William Gilmartin and myself then organized a Company of the Irish Volunteers in Cliffoney area. At that time we had a Catholic Curate the late Father Michael O'Flanagan, a great Irishman and strong supporter of the Republican Movement. He gave us every assistance and encouragement and advised the young men of the parish to join the Irish Volunteers. In all, forty men joined the Cliffoney Company.

The Cliffoney Company took over the Old Boys' School, and renamed it after Fr. O'Flanagan. The building was used as a drilling and parade hall, even though it was just across the street from the R.I.C. barracks. The Cliffoney Company were out marching in uniform for Saint Patrick's Day 1916.

In his report at the end of March the County Inspector mentioned that a branch of the Irish Volunteers had been formed at Cliffony and that other branches were in the process of being formed. He reported that the Cliffony Volunteers had paraded to the number of fifty on St. Patrick's Day wearing uniforms. They attended Mass at Cliffony and then "paraded the roads." Their leaders, William Gilmartin and Andrew Conway, carried revolvers, he reported. On the same day, he said. Alec McCabe led a parade of 69 "Sinn Féiners" in Ballymote. McCabe was reported as wearing the uniform of the Irish Volunteers and the others wearing Irish Volunteer armbands.

They were ready for action a month later for the Easter Insurrection 1916, with orders to march along the route to Sligo capturing R.I.C. barracks along the way, but stood down when Eoin MacNeil's countermanding order came from Dublin.

The Cliffony Volunteers mobilised in the early hours of Easter Monday, 60 strong, including Fianna boys. At the break of day they were ready to advance on Sligo when a messenger arrived cancelling all active operations pending further orders from H.Q. The Volunteers remained in readiness for over a week in the hope of taking part in the rebellion but with the surrender in Dublin all hope ended and they disbanded.

"On Sunday April 30th, the day after the surrender in Dublin, a parade was held by the Irish Volunteers in Cliffony. No arms were carried." On 6 May some sixty soldiers from the North Staffordshire regiment arrived in Sligo by train. They proceeded by car to Cliffony on the morning of 7 May with orders to arrest any Volunteers at large in the area. The Cliffoney Company were forewarned, but fifteen men were arrested and subsequently deported first to Sligo Goal, then Dublin and finally Wandsworth prison close to London.

==== Moneygold Ambush 1920 ====
The R.I.C. barracks in Cliffoney, occupying the corner opposite the church, hall and hotel, was constructed on Lord Palmerston's orders in 1842, after some surveyors in his employment were beaten up by disgruntled locals. At the time he was having his land "squared" which entailed reorganising landholdings and leases on his Ahamlish estates. The R.I.C. became a constant presence in the village from 1842 until 1921.

On 25 October 1920, Sergeant Perry led a bicycle patrol of eight constables to investigate a case of malicious damage in Magherow. The group, which left Cliffoney barracks at 11.00 am, cycled into an ambush at Derry cross close to Ahamlish graveyard at 11.30 am. Some thirty to forty members of the North Sligo I.R.A., led by Liam Pilkington and Seamus Devins opened fire on the R.I.C., killing three instantly and wounding three more. The remaining three constables surrendered. Sergeant Patrick Perry, Constables Patrick Laffey and Patrick Keown died at the scene. Constables Lynch, Clarke and O'Rourke were wounded, with Patrick Lynch dying of his wounds that evening. Constables Spratt, McCormack and Joyce unhurt.

The three uninjured constables were deprived of their weapons and the weapons of the dead and wounded were collected. The ambushers then left the scene as the Angelus bell was ringing. One of the ambushers in fact had the job of ringing the bell and the ambush was over just in time to allow him to race across the fields to ring the bell at Grange church.

==== Moneygold reprisals ====
A few days after the ambush, E Company of the Auxiliaries based in Coolavin came to north Sligo to search for the ambushers and to make reprisals.

At Moneygold eight miles from Sligo (between Grange and Cliffony in Co. Sligo), the IRA ambush a nine-man RIC patrol, killing four. The IRA was led by Sligo Brigade O/C William Pilkington. Auxiliaries, who were stationed at the residence of The McDermott in Coolavin, traveled to north Sligo some time after the ambush and searched the countryside for the ambushers. The County Inspector reported. "The houses of some leading suspects were burned as well as the Father O'Flanagan Sinn Féin Hall at Cliffony". The Crown forces threw a cordon around the Grange area and spent two nights searching for the ambushers. Many houses were burned.

The burnings continued over a number of nights throughout North Sligo. Several cottages in Grange village and the Temperance hall were burned, as was Ballintrillick creamery. In Cliffoney, ten cottages along the main road, all belonging to prominent Sinn Féin members, and the Fr. O'Flanagan Sinn Féin Hall in the village were also burned, and the legend "Vacated Home of Murder Gang" was painted on the front of the hall. Gillespie's Tailor shop in the village was raided, and all the contents taken out into the street and burned.

== Amenities ==
=== Local business ===
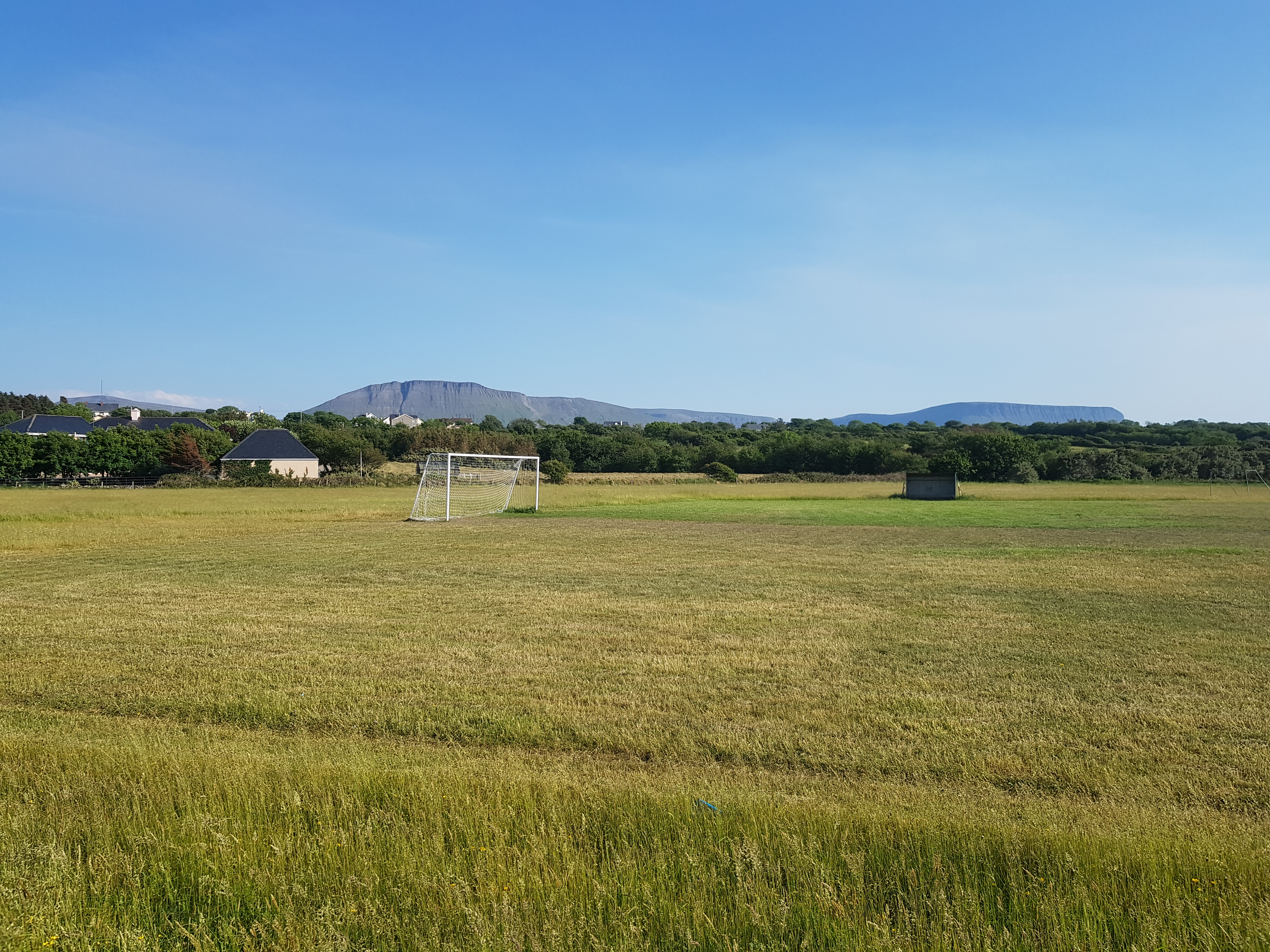
Home pitch of local football club Cliffoney Celtic

Cliffoney village is arranged around a cross-roads on the N15 with the church, community hall, public house and old RIC barracks each occupying a corner. There are several businesses located in the village, including a hair salon, two bars and a craft shop. There is one shop in the village, a Gala outlet, which underwent a refurbishment in September 2017.

=== Cliffoney National School ===
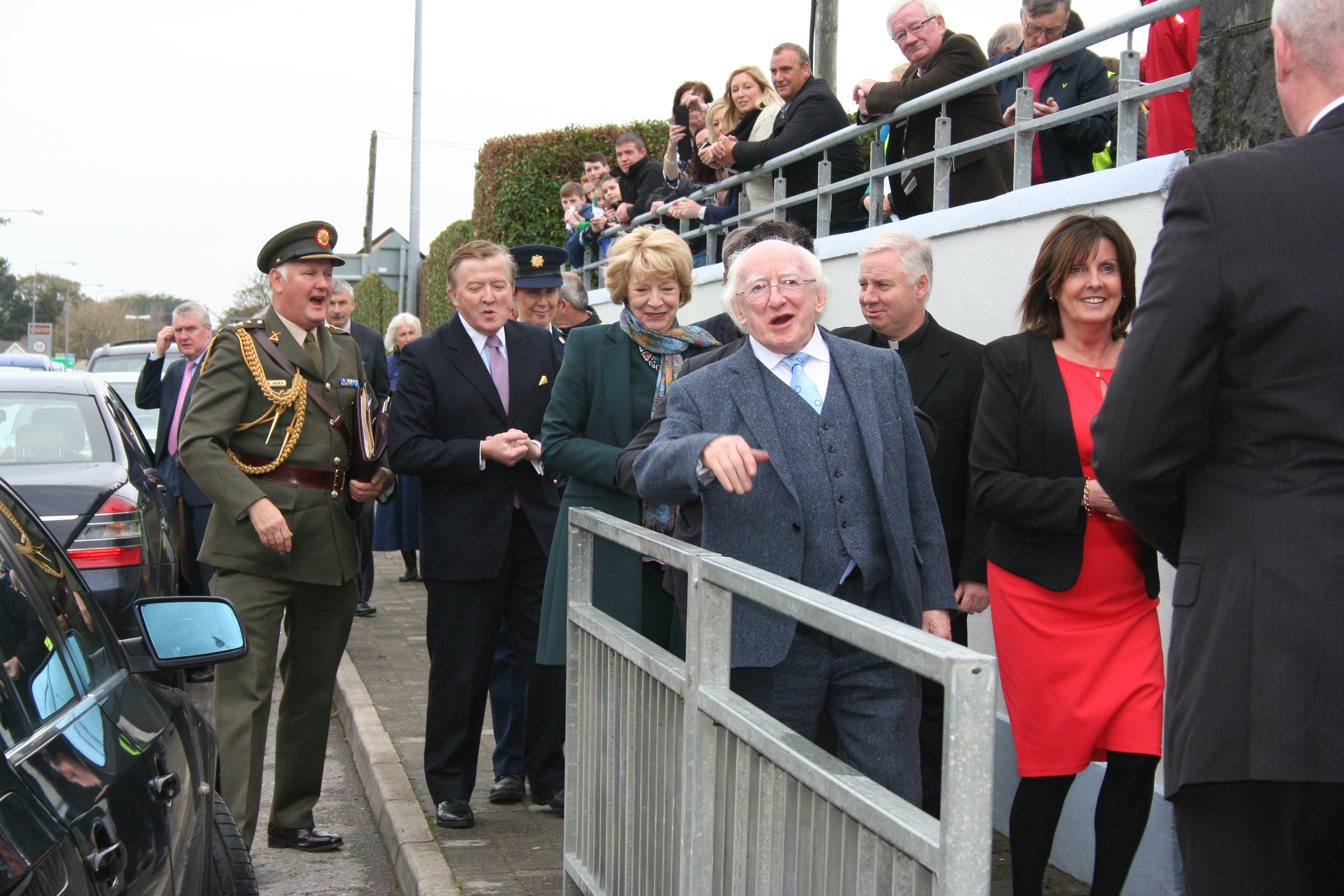
President of Ireland Michael D. Higgins pictured waking into Cliffoney National School with his wife Sabina (left), principal Ita MacGowan and Fr. Christy McHugh (right)

Cliffoney National school was opened in 1914, replacing the old schools built by Lord Palmerston. When the school opened, it was mixed, however, there were no mixed classes. In 1972, Mullaghmore School closed and its 13 pupils transferred to Cliffoney National School. The school was renovated in the 1970s. In 1991, the wooden partition that split boys and girls classes was taken down, and the school was extended, with the addition of a new school pitch. In 2007, the old part of the school was refurbished and two new classrooms and a staffroom were added.

In October 2014, President Michael D. Higgins attended the commemoration of the centenary of the opening of Cliffoney National School. The pupils of Cliffoney NS performed for the president, with the president making a speech afterwards, speaking about W.B. Yeats, Classiebawn Castle, and the school's history.

=== Church of St. Molaise ===
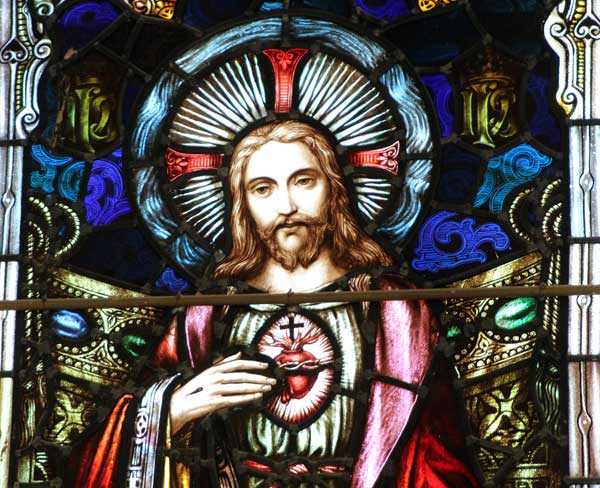
Stained glass window by Joshua Clarke, St. Molaise's RC church, Cliffoney, installed 1909.

The Roman Catholic church is dedicated to Saint Molaise from Inishmurray island. The church was opened in 1828, replacing an older structure called Teampeall Bui down the hill and close to Saint Briget's well. Cliffoney church was closed for an extensive period in 1915 when the whole village united in protest against the Bishop of Elphin, Dr. Bernard Coyne, who had removed Fr. Michael O'Flanagan. The protest which was widely reported in the newspapers, continued for ten weeks until Christmas Eve 1915.

In October Fr O'Flanagan was transferred by his Bishop to the parish of Crossna, County Roscommom. His parishioners saw this as punishment for his involvement with the bog dispute and did not take kindly to the move. They locked up the church at Cliffony and refused to hand over the key to the new curate, Fr McHugh. This dispute continued until Christmas Day 1915. On that morning the key to Cliffony church was handed to the Parish Priest. The people meanwhile were presumably enjoying the warmth of the C.D.B. turf.

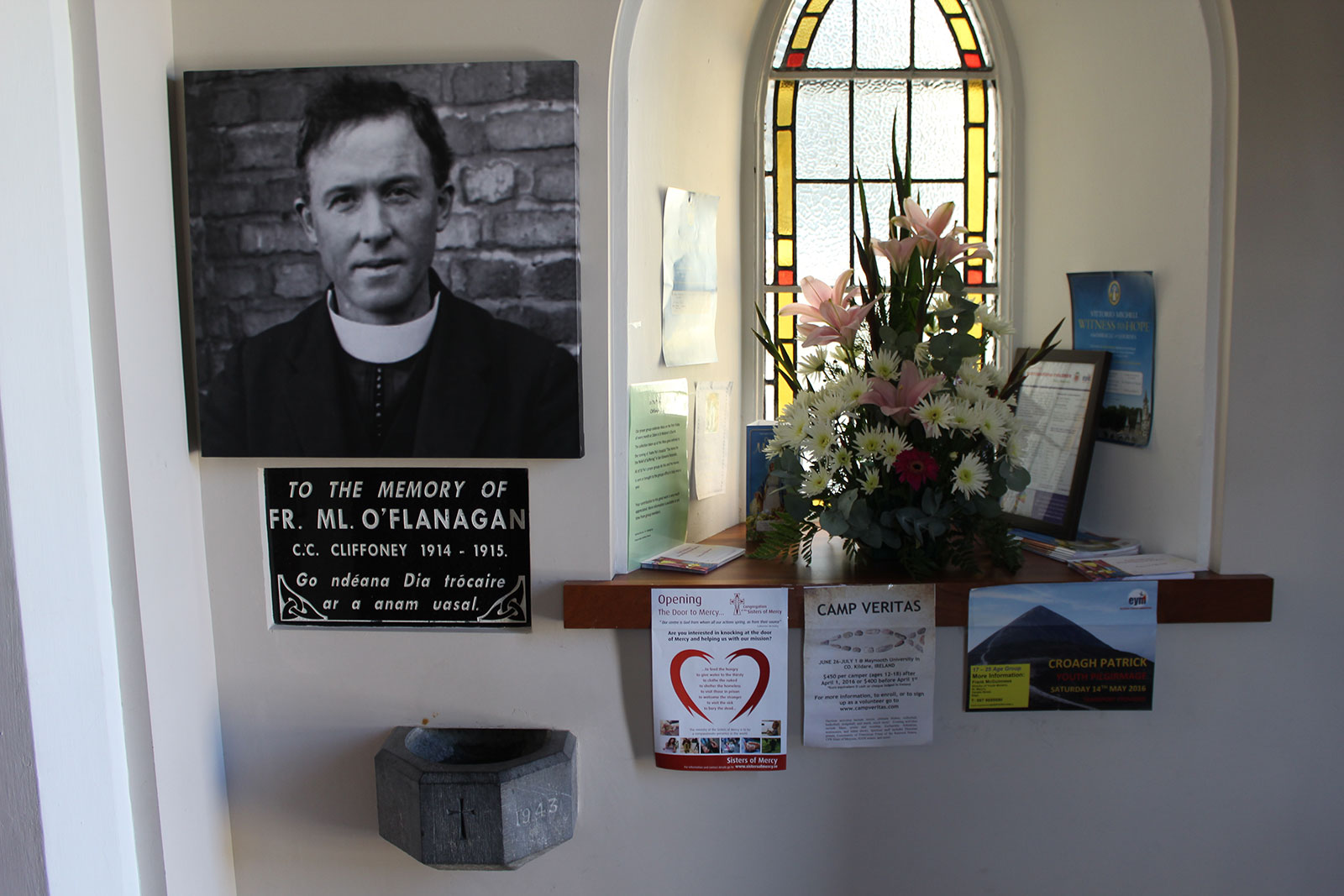
A holy water font was installed in the porch of St. Molaise's church in 1942 in memory of Fr. O'Flanagan, on condition that his name was not to be added. The plaque, with name finally allowed, was added in 1992.

The church was closed again during restoration in 2012 and masses were held in the village hall. During cleaning the restorers discovered that the three stained glass windows behind the altar were made by Joshua Clarke, father of the renowned stained glass artist Harry Clarke. Joshua Clarke was married to Brigid MacGonigall, a native of Cliffoney village.

=== Cliffoney Hall ===
The village community hall dates to 1824. The building came into the possession community in 1915 due to the work of Father Michael O'Flanagan. The building became the Cliffoney Sinn Féin club and was used for drilling by the Cliffoney Volunteers. The hall was burned at the end of October 1920 during the reprisals for the Moneygold ambush. It was later rebuilt and renamed the more neutral Cliffoney Parochial Hall.

The hall was renovated in 2016 and is used for community activities and fundraisers.

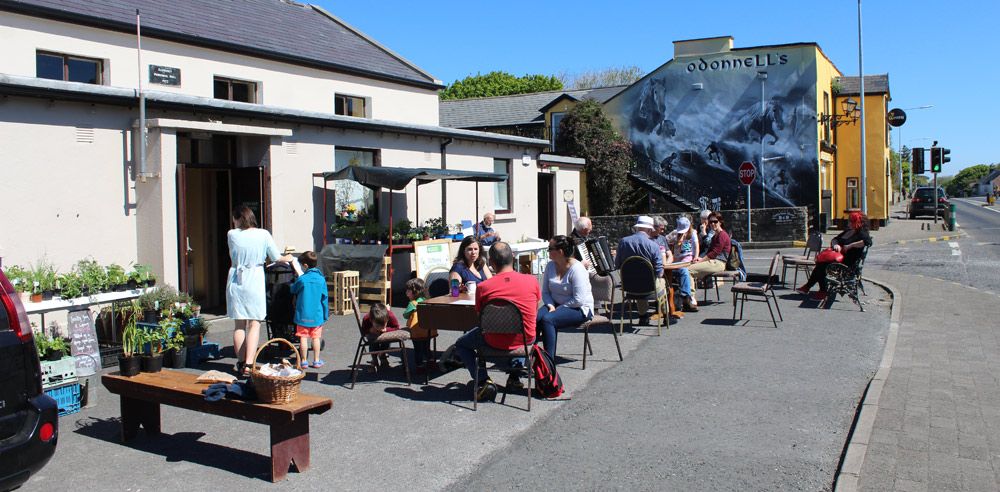
Cliffoney Country Market takes place in the village hall twice each month. The mural on the gable of O'Donnell's Bar was painted in 2015.

=== Garda station ===
Cliffoney's Garda station was closed in early February 2013. Since then, Cliffoney and the surrounding areas have been served by Grange Garda Station. The station was handed over to the Cliffoney Development Group by Minister Brian Hayes in July 2014, with plans for the building to be used as a men's shed or tourist office. In 2024 a men's shed was opened on the site of the abandoned Garda station.
