= R279 road (Ireland) =

Regional road in Ireland

R279 road
- Bóthar R279
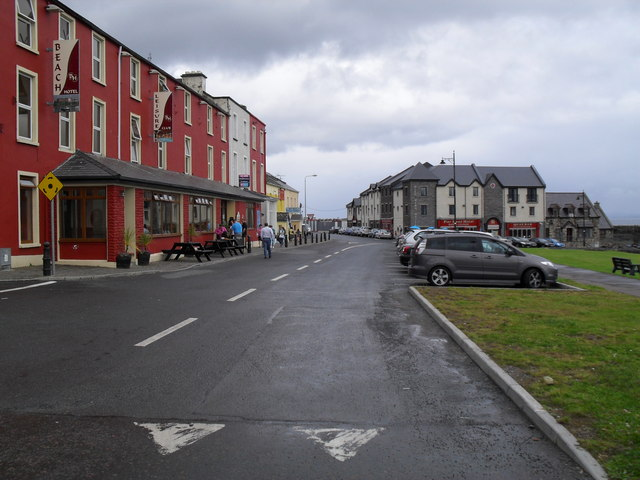
- Mullaghmore village at the north end of R279

Route information
- Length: 4.4 km (2.7 mi)

Major junctions
- From: N15 Cliffoney
- To: Mullaghmore pier

Location
- Country: Ireland

Highway system
- Roads in Ireland; Motorways; Primary; Secondary; Regional

The R279 road is a regional road in Ireland linking Cliffoney and Mullaghmore in County Sligo. The 19th century Classiebawn Castle is located on this road just before entering Mullaghmore. The entire road is part of the Wild Atlantic Way, which continues around Mullaghmore Head after the end of the R279.

== See also ==
- Roads in Ireland
