= Thomas Deignan =

Irish Republican soldier and politician (1897–1976)

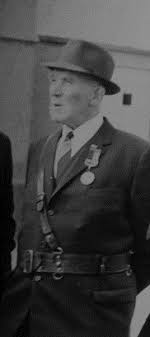
- Thomas Deignan at the 1966 50 yr Easter 1916 Commemoration in Markievicz Park
- Born: 11 June 1897; Doongelagh, Sligo, Ireland
- Died: 27 August 1976 (aged 79)
- Burial place: Ballyrush cemetery
- Occupations: Farmer, Politician, Soldier
- Years active: 1917–1976
- Spouse: Annie (née Brennan)
- Children: Brendan Deignan; Tommy Deignan; Donal Deignan; Eileen White; Anna Costello
- Relatives: Philip Deignan (Grand Nephew)

Thomas (Tom) Deignan (11 June 1897 – 27 August 1976) was a Commandant of the Irish Republican Army in the Irish War of Independence, politician and veteran of World War I. He fought on the Anti-Treaty side in the Irish Civil War. After the war he entered local politics until his death.

== Early life ==
Thomas Deignan was born in Doongelagh (Killadoon) County Sligo, Ireland on 11 June 1897. His parents were Thomas Deignan, a farmer, and Margaret Kelly. He was the fourth of their eight children. In 1915 at the age of 18 Deignan emigrated to the United States and together with his three brothers Patrick, John and Hugh they resided at 198 East 76th Street, New York. Deignan worked as a lift attendant and a chauffeur for over a year before he voluntarily enlisted in the US Army.

On 9 July 1917 Deignan enlisted in the 69th New York Infantry Regiment of the American army. The unit did its basic training in the US and were attached to the 42nd Rainbow Division of the AEF (American Expeditionary Forces) and were shipped to France after a month of further training in England.

Deignan saw active service on the Western Front from November 1917 to March 1919. Deignan was wounded several times by 3rd degree burns and exposure to mustard gas. Despite these combat wounds Deignan got through the war without any long term disabilities. He got a recommendation for rescue work in Fr. Duffys story.

After the war ended in November 1918 Deignan's regiment were retained for peace keeping duties and did not return to the USA until March 1919. Deignan received an honorable discharge on 22 March and was now a US citizen and received his passport in November 1919 whereupon he had decided to return to Ireland for six months as his mother was seriously ill at the time. Despite his intentions he was never to return to the USA.

== Irish War of Independence ==
In late 1919 Deignan joined Gleann Company, 5th Battalion Sligo Brigade of the IRA. His brother John, who had also returned from the USA, was a Lieutenant in the same company. Within a month he was appointed Officer in Command of the Riverstown Battalion. For the first few months the unit were primarily engaged in gathering an arsenal. Every house in the area was visited by the IRA to retrieve whatever firearms they could get. They also performed local policing duties as the British controlled police force, the RIC, were no longer trusted and were considered part of the collaborating occupying force. Deignan's main goal, as O/C, at this time was to drill and train the brigade for combat.

Deignan orchestrated an ambush of an RIC patrol at Ballyrush in July 1920. He had eight men a few revolvers and shotguns. They lay in wait and opened fire on the patrol. The RIC were captured dis-armed and subsequently released.

In November 1920 Deignan was involved in planning a large scale ambush of the RIC near Collooney. They had about 20 men and got into position the night before. Frank Carty who was the officer in charge was to signal the attack by firing the first shot however instead of the expected RIC lorry they were met with four British military lorries full of troops. Carty did not initiate the attack and they were allowed to go through.

Deignan took part in the bombing and attempted bombing of a number of RIC stations. On Friday 11 February 1921 an attempt to bomb the RIC station in Ballaghaderreen with a large mine concealed in a hay cart. A patrol of RIC enforcing a curfew came upon them, shots were exchanged and this attempt was foiled. A bomb was successfully detonated at Collooney RIC station on Sunday 20 March.

On 25 Oct 1920 Sligo IRA Volunteers carried out an ambush on a RIC patrol in which 8 RIC men were killed. This triggered fierce reprisals in the County by the Black and Tan's and RIC. A number of RIC constables were particularly diligent in pinpointing homes and businesses for burning and during this time Deignan's parents home and out-buildings were burned to the ground by the Black and Tans. They first burned a hay shed in which some arms and a mine were hidden causing an explosion but nobody was injured. The tans then set fire to the thatched residence but scampered away very quickly in fear of further mines.

On Tuesday 19 April 1921 intelligence was received that a contingent of soldiers and RIC were returning from a meeting in Dublin Castle by train. A unit of local IRA volunteers including Deignan and led by Commandment Billy Pilkington boarded the train at Ballysadare. The British soldiers were dis-armed and allowed to go free however two of the RIC men were singled out as they were identified as particularly vicious in the recent reprisals. They were taken from the train and executed. In a witness statement given to the military archives in 1953 Deignan stated "They were carrying large envelopes from the Castle which contained descriptions of some of our men who were wanted by the police. These descriptions were very accurate"

In Culfadda near Ballymote, on 1 June 1921, while trying to meet with the local Battalion leader to plan an operation in the area Deignan was shot at and apprehended by a troop of British soldiers. He was recognized as a wanted man but as luck would have it there were no RIC or Black & Tans on hand so they were unable to associate him with any specific engagement. He was brutally interrogated for several days and then transferred to Sligo Gaol on 5 June. During this transfer an attempt was made to ambush it and rescue him by a unit of local IRA volunteers however they did not prevail and Deignan was delivered to the gaol. At this time there were about 160 prisoners incarcerated and amongst them were Frank O'Beirne and Charles Gildea. These men had already been sentenced and knew their fate. Fearful of recognition by one of the freed soldiers from the Ballisodare shooting Deignan and the aforementioned O'Beirne and Gildea decided that escape was the only option. However this was going to be perilous. Prior to a previous escape of Frank Carty there had been a military guard of up to forty men stationed in the gaol to help prevent a recurrence.

With the help of a warder, Joseph Henry, who was sympathetic to the cause they took impressions of the cell and some outer door keys. These were given to a local unit on the outside who were able to create copies and smuggle them back into the gaol. The escape was carefully planned in unison with Billy Pilkington who arranged for an armed unit to cover off the front of the gaol hidden by hay carts. This was to prevent the military from getting out or any other reinforcements from getting in. Another unit were deployed to throw a rope ladder over the wall and to meet the escapees on the outside. In the early hours of 29 June the call to action finally came. Tom and his comrades got out of their cell, the friendly warder who was guarding the corridor that night was tied up and gagged in order to remove any suspicion of his involvement. They made their way between two sentry towers to the hangman's yard. The rope ladder had already been slung over the wall. All 3 were able to climb over where they were met by comrades and furnished with bicycles. From there they cycled to a safe house Clarkes of Tirrearagh and returned to life on the run.

== Irish Civil War ==
A troop of Free state soldiers were garrisoned at Taunagh National school. Deignan and his comrades initiated a siege of the school in which they successfully forced the unit to flee. However during this conflict Deignan was injured and lost three fingers from his right hand. He was removed for medical treatment. During his return journey from hospital the car he was travelling in came under attack at Taylor's Cross, Coola. One of the occupants of the car, Tom Sheerin, was shot and later died from the injury sustained in this attack.

By late 1923 Deignan was interned in the Curragh by the Free State Government under W. T. Cosgrave along with 12,000 other anti-treaty soldiers. He was released in 1924.

== After the conflicts, political career and death ==
In 1952 Deignan stood as a Fianna Fáil candidate in the Sligo County Council election. He topped the poll, reached the quota and was elected on the first count. He successfully contested three more elections and was a serving elected councilor until his death in 1976. For a time after the conflicts Deignan sold insurance. In 1931 he married Annie Brennan who was also a member of Cumann na mBan during the Irish War of Independence and the Irish Civil War. They settled in Ardvarney, Riverstown, County Sligo where he farmed a small holding. Deignan died in 1976 and was buried in Ballyrush cemetery alongside his wife Annie. At his funeral there was a three-volley salute, a guard of honor provided by surviving IRA comrades and an oration by Judge B. Brennan.

== Sources ==
- Farry, Michael (1992). Sligo 1914-1921 : a chronicle of conflict (PDF). Trim, Co. Meath: Killoran Press. ISBN 0-9520135-0-9. OCLC 27718030.
