= Mullaghmore, County Sligo =

Mullaghmore An Mullach Mór
- Village
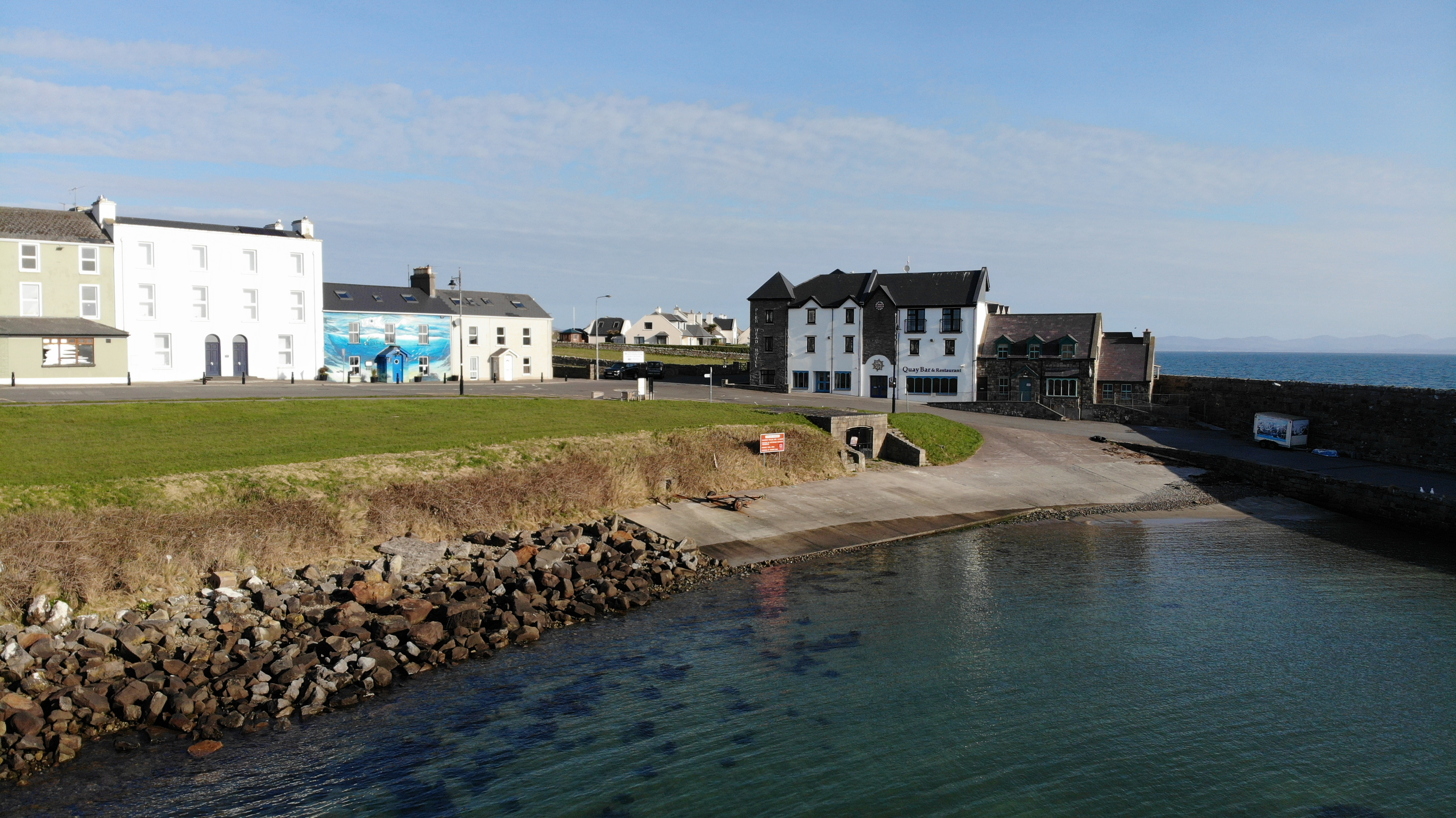
- Mullaghmore Harbour

- Location in Ireland
- Coordinates: 54.4664°N 8.4486°W
- Country: Ireland
- Province: Connacht
- County: County Sligo

Population (2022)
  - Total: 172
- Irish Grid Reference: G709577

Mullaghmore (Irish: An Mullach Mór, meaning 'the great summit') is a village on the Mullaghmore Peninsula in the north of County Sligo in the west of Ireland. It is a holiday destination with a skyline dominated by Benbulben mountain. It is in the barony of Carbury and parish of Ahamlish.

== History ==
From the 17th to the 19th centuries it was part of the large estate belonging to the Temple family in north Sligo. The land, some 4,900 hectares (12,000 acres), was granted to Sir John Temple (1600–1677), Master of the Rolls in Dublin. Sir John's direct descendant, The 3rd Viscount Palmerston (1784–1865), began the building of Classiebawn Castle on the peninsula, a baronial-style house designed by James Rawson Carroll. Lord Palmerston also built the stone-walled harbour in the village, which was designed by the marine engineer Alexander Nimmo. It was built between 1822 and 1841.

The Temples were mostly absentee landlords, with the estate being run initially by middlemen, and later by land agents, such as Stewart and Kincaid, a Dublin firm with offices in Sligo. These agents, in their attempts to make the estates profitable, oversaw the "assisted emigration" that took place on the Palmerston and adjacent Gore-Booth (Lissadell) estate that began before the Great Famine and continued until at least the 1860s.

Thus, in May 1862, a Sligo newspaper reported: "In accordance with a custom of some years' standing, about sixty persons have been selected for emigration from the Parish of Ahamlish ... whose passages and outfit has been provided by his Lordship. They consist of twenty-four young girls, and twenty young men ... [and] families who were wholly unable to support themselves ... who had asked the favour of being sent out ... The emigrants took their passages ... this day, for Liverpool, en route for America."

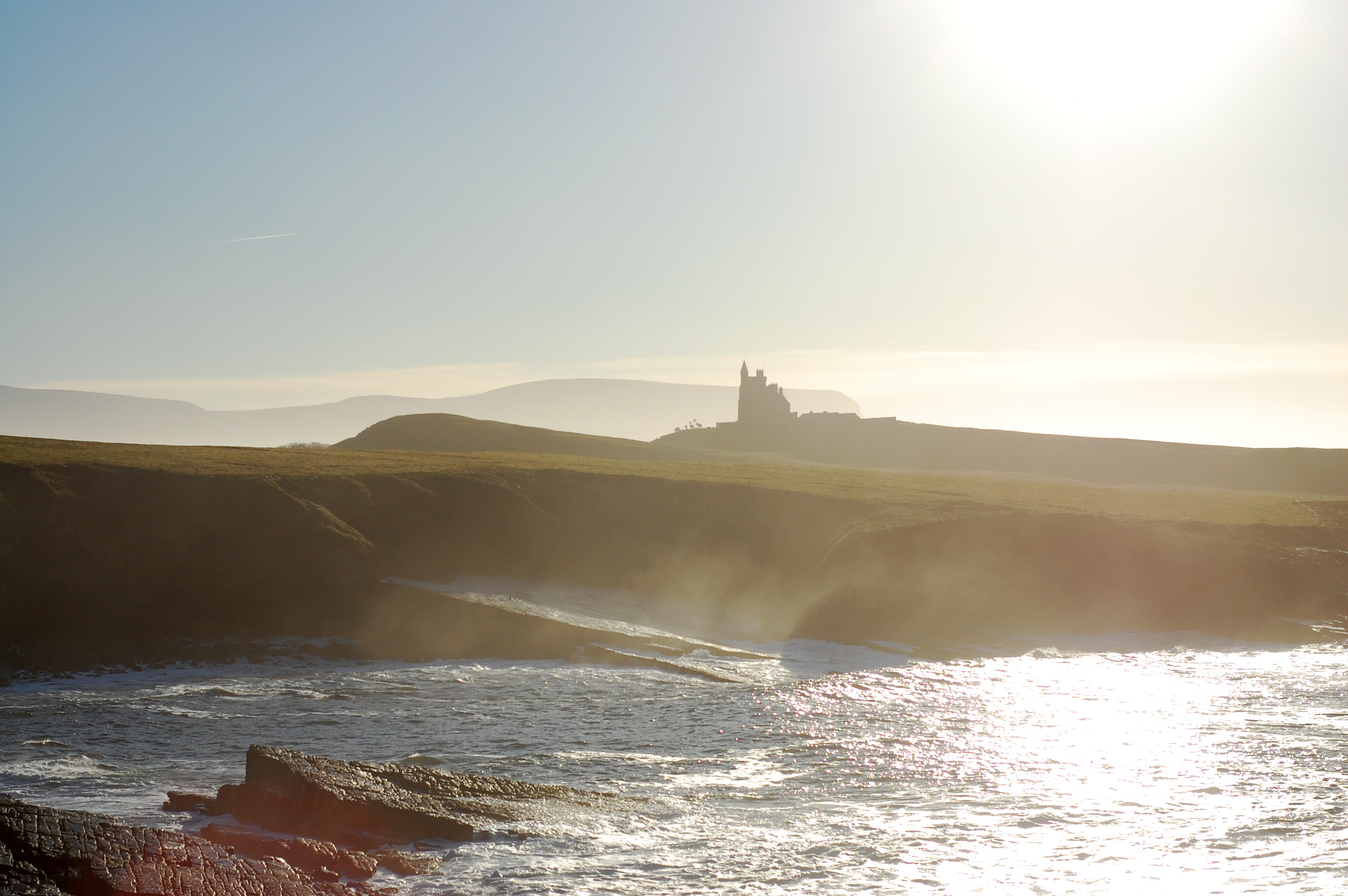
Classiebawn Castle

Lord Palmerston presided over Mullaghmore and North Sligo during the worst years of the Great Famine of the mid-19th century. During the summer and autumn of 1847, nine vessels, carrying over 2,000 persons, left Sligo port with tenants evicted and "shovelled out" from his Sligo estates. They arrived in Canada destitute and half-naked. The city of Saint John in the colony of New Brunswick had to take many of Palmerston's evicted tenants into care and, outraged, sent a scathing letter to Palmerston expressing regret and fury that he or his agents, "should have exposed such a numerous and distressed portion of his tenantry to the severity and privation of a New Brunswick winter ... unprovided with the common means of support, with broken-down constitutions and almost in a state of nudity ... without regard to humanity or even common decency." The graves of many of these unfortunate victims can be seen today on the old quarantine station, now a museum, at Grosse Isle, in the St. Lawrence River opposite Quebec City.

Classiebawn was a favoured holiday retreat of Admiral of the Fleet The 1st Earl Mountbatten of Burma, who had served as the last Viceroy of India. It was off the Mullaghmore coast in August 1979 that Lord Mountbatten of Burma, along with his fourteen-year-old grandson Nicholas Knatchbull and Doreen, Lady Brabourne, together with County Fermanagh teenager Paul Maxwell, were killed by a bomb planted by the Provisional IRA.

In 2007, it hosted the final stage of Rally Ireland. Sebastian Loeb won the Rally of Ireland and went on to win his 4th World Championship title.

== Surfing ==
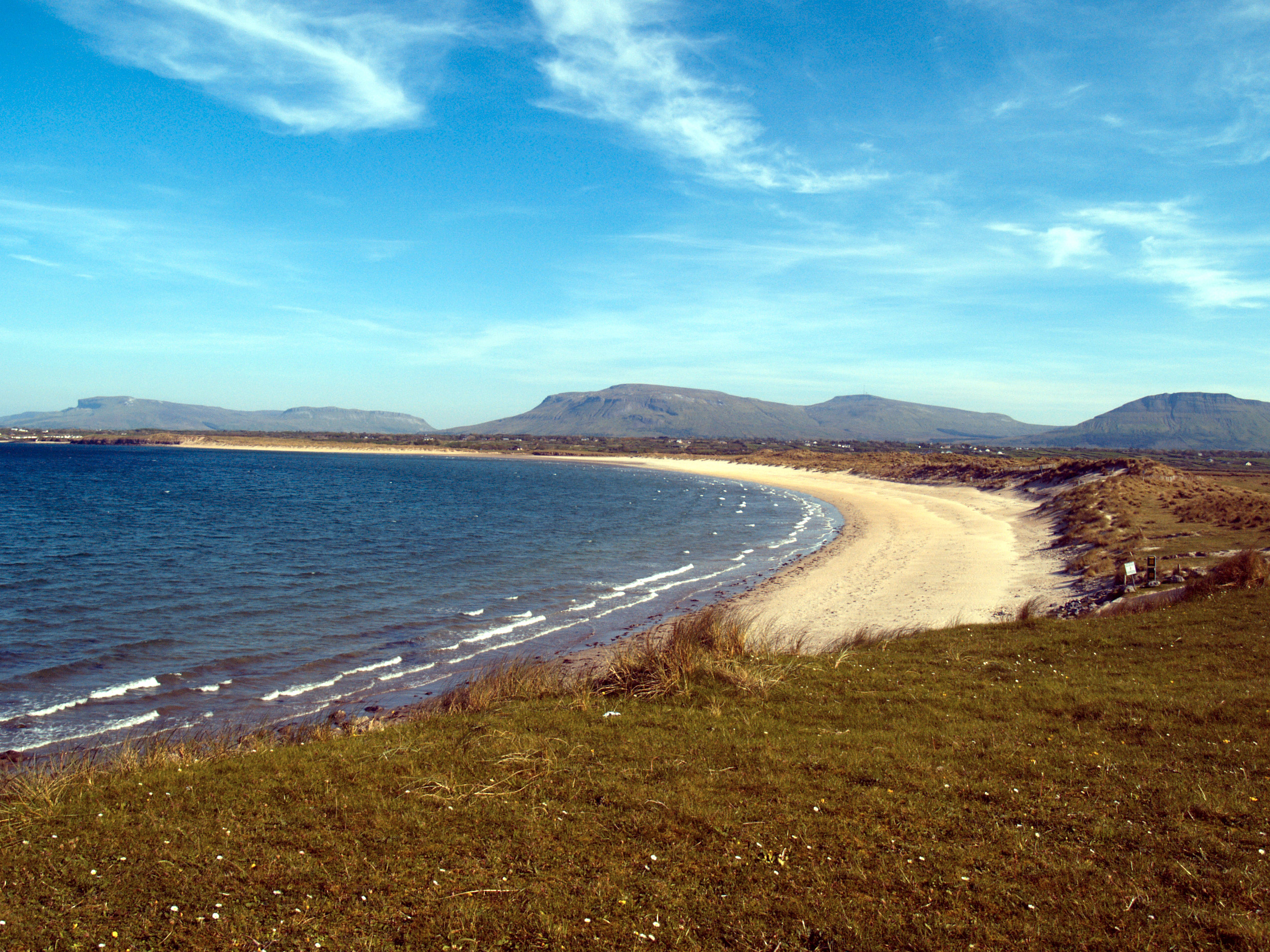
Mullaghmore Beach (Bunduff Strand)

Mullaghmore is a big wave surfing destination. On 8 March 2012, surfers and windsurfers from all over the world rode waves up to 15 metres (49 ft) high off Mullaghmore Head. These waves were about five metres (16 ft) less than the tallest wave ever recorded in Ireland in County Donegal on 13 December 2011, which was 20.4 metres (67 ft) high.

The waves in Mullaghmore were generated by a complex weather system nicknamed the "Viking storm" leading to big wave conditions in the area for the month of March for 15 years. Some riders suffered bruising as well as broken bones and surfboards.

A North American low-pressure system moved east and combined with another cyclone in the Western Atlantic. This system moved into an area off the coast of Ireland that already had high waves owing to a series of strong systems the previous week. In addition, a strong anticyclone over the Azores created a large pressure gradient in the North Atlantic that directed a strong fetch towards Ireland. There was also an extended fetch length in the North Atlantic in the direction of Europe while the swell was created. These combined conditions produced waves that were confirmed by satellite data on 7 March 2012 to have exceeded 15 metres (49 ft) in height.

== Amenities ==
Mullaghmore is served by two hotels, a seafood restaurant, a grocery shop, a spiritual retreat centre and a fish farm. There is also a variety of B&Bs in Mullaghmore. Mullaghmore's busiest times for trade and tourism are during the summer months of May, June, July and August, with the busiest being the weekend of the 12th of July, and the August Bank Holiday weekend. Most of these businesses close for the winter months, except the fish farm.

Mullaghmore also has a sandy beach nearly two kilometres (1 1/4 miles) in length. There is no lifeguard on duty.

=== Star Of The Sea Retreat and Conference Centre ===
The Star of the Sea Building originally housed the coast guard in the nineteenth century, and the Sligo Sisters of Mercy made it their home in August 1929. In the 1970s, the Convent began to welcome retreats. The entire building was overhauled and renovated in the 1990s. In 2010, The Mullaghmore Peace Garden was the latest addition to the facility. In 2015, Prince Charles visited the garden. In 2013, the Convent was handed over by the Sisters of the Western Province to the Bishop of Elphin and was run by God. Sr. Kathleen Rooney, R.S.M.. She ran the retreat until August 2020.

== Transport ==
The village is served by TFI Local Link Route 982, which runs from Ballyshannon to Sligo. The bus arrives at Mullaghmore five times per day Monday to Saturday, and three times per day on Sunday. For long-distance routes, the nearest Bus Éireann stop is at Cliffoney, around 5 kilometres (3.1 mi) distant, and is served several times per day.

== Notable people ==
- Joe McGowan (born 1939), historian and author

== See also ==
- List of towns and villages in the Republic of Ireland
- Surfing in Ireland
- Wild Atlantic Way
