= Joe McGowan =

Irish historian (born 1939)

Joe McGowan (7 January 1939, Mullaghmore, Co. Sligo, Ireland) is an Irish historian, folklorist, and author specialising in the history and heritage of Ireland. He is based in Sligo.

== Bibliography ==
- 1993 In the Shadow of Benbulben: A Portrait of Our Storied Past, Aeolus Publications
- 1998 Inishmurray: Gale, Stone and Fire, Aeolus Publications
- 2001 Echoes of a Savage Land, Mercier Press,
- 2003 Constance Markievicz: People's Countess, Cottage Press
- 2004 Sligo: Land of Destiny, Aeolus Publications
- 2005 Inishmurray: Island Voices, Aeolus Publications History and heritage of Inishmurray Island, Co. Sligo
- 2007 "A Fairy Wind", short stories, music, songs and monologues, Aeolus Publications
- 2009 "A Bitter Wind", Aeolus Publications, an account of Irish country life as it was lived up to and including the 20th century.
- 2015 "Sligo Folk Tales", Irish History Press, legends, myths and folklore of Co. Sligo

2021 "Even the Heather Bled" Aeolus Publications, Irish/Sligo history from the Norman conquest to the Civil War 2026 "Famine: Voices of a Lost Generation"
