= Lisa Stanley =

English/Irish singer and television presenter

- Born: 12 March 1973 (age 52); Sligo, Ireland
- Occupations: Singer; songwriter; Presenter
- Years active: 1999–present
- Television: The Lisa Stanley Show; The Phil Mack Country Show
- Parents: Fintan Stanley (father); Maisie McDaniel (mother)
- Musical career
- Genres: easy listening; country music; pop
- Instruments: Vocals; Piano

Lisa Stanley (born 12 March 1973) is an Irish singer, songwriter, and presenter, based in the UK and Ireland. Stanley was born in Sligo, Ireland, and is the only child of Irish entertainers Maisie McDaniel and Fintan Stanley.

== Early career ==
Stanley's career started in the 1990s when she joined the Sligo-based wedding band, The Treetops. In the late 1990s she made her first national performance at the Cavan International Song Contest. In 2000, she sang her own composition, Shine, in the National Song Contest, making it to the "top eight". The following year, she sang the same song at the Baltic Song Contest which took place in Karlshamn, Sweden. In 2004, Stanley toured the country with "Dancehall Queues and Hucklebuck Shoes", a show which featured the "grown-up children of [..] stars of the famed Showband era". She made appearances in various television shows and released her first album.

== Albums ==
Stanley's second solo album was titled Love Me A Little Bit Longer. She was voted the best country female singer in the Irish entertainment awards 2010, Tipp FM Best Female Singer in 2012, and an Irish Country Music Radio Award in 2014. In 2010, Stanley released her first studio album, Lisa Stanley sings the hits of Masie McDaniel, as a tribute to her mother, who died that year. This album included duets with Sandy Kelly, Philomena Begley, her father Fintan Stanley, and with Maisie's sister, Deirdre McDaniel. In the following two years, Lisa Stanley released her third album, Duets with Philomena Begley, John Hogan and Sandy Kelly. Early in 2016, she released a new single with Max T Barnes entitled Looking for a Girl. This song featured in her fourth studio album, 'Heart And Soul' which is her most commercially successful album to date reaching number 11 in the iTunes charts for country music. In 2020, Stanley re-released a version of her national Song Contest song Shine.

== Television and radio ==
Stanley had weekly appearances on the Spotlight TV program, the "Phil Mack International Country Show". In January 2016, Stanley went on to launch her own show, "The Lisa Stanley Show", on Spotlight TV. In 2019, she was part of Daniel O’Donnell's TV series "Opry Le Daniel", which aired on TG4.

She is a member of "50 minutes Inside" on TF1 television in France.

== Discography ==
Title	Release date
Lisa Stanley sings the hits of Masie McDaniel	16 January 2011
Love Me A Little Bit Longer	9 February 2012
Duets	2 January 2014
Heart and Soul	24 November 2017
