= Hugh O'Neill Hencken =

American archaeologist

Hugh O'Neill Hencken FBA
- Born: January 8, 1902; New York, New York
- Died: August 31, 1981 (aged 79); Barnstable, Massachusetts
- Education: Princeton University; University of Cambridge
- Known for: Archaeology of Iron Age Europe
- Spouses: May Davies Hopkins; Thalassa Cruso
- Children: Ala Mary; Caroline Sophia; Thalassa

Hugh O'Neill Hencken FBA (January 8, 1902 – August 31, 1981) was an American archaeologist who specialized in Iron Age Europe. He was curator of European archaeology at the Peabody Museum, Harvard University, from 1932 to 1972.

== Career ==
O'Neill Hencken was born in New York City on January 8, 1902, to an Irish American family. He studied at Princeton University and the University of Cambridge, where he obtained a B.A. (1926), an M.A. (1929), and his PhD in archaeology in 1930. He was appointed the curator of European archaeology at the Peabody Museum of Archaeology and Ethnology in 1932, serving until his retirement in 1972. During this period he also held positions as a lecturer at Harvard University, director and chairman of the American School of Prehistoric Research, the Peabody Museum's research division, and taught at the University of Oxford, the University of London, and the University of Edinburgh. In the 1940s he was part of the American Defense Harvard Group, a committee of Harvard faculty that compiled lists of historic monuments for the Allied forces in World War II.

Specializing in Iron Age Europe, O'Neill Hencken worked in a number of countries, including England, Ireland, Morocco, Algeria, Italy, and Greece. Between 1934 and 1936, he directed the archaeological programme of Earnest Hooton's Harvard Archaeological Mission to Ireland, including excavations in County Antrim, County Londonderry, and County Down. As curator at the Peabody Museum, he acquired much of the material and notes from the Duchess of Mecklenburg's excavations in Slovenia, conducted between 1904 and 1913, which were confiscated at the end of World War I and eventually sold at auction in the 1930s. This included the collection from Slovene: Magdalenska gora, an important Iron Age cemetery, which O'Neill Hencken was able to finally bring to publication in 1978, sixty-five years after it was excavated. In the later years of his career he published a number of major synthetic studies, including The Earliest European Helmets (1971), and two volumes dealing with Etruscan origins, Tarquinia, Villanovans and Early Etruscans (1968) and Tarquinia and Etruscan Origins (1968).

O'Neill Hencken was an honorary member of the Prehistoric Society and was elected a corresponding fellow of the British Academy in 1972. A Festschrift in his honour, Ancient Europe and the Mediterranean, edited by Vladimir Markotic, was published in 1977. His collected papers are held by the Harvard Library.

== Personal life ==
Hugh O'Neill Hencken married Mary Davies Hopkins at the Episcopal Church in Sedgefield, North Carolina on June 8, 1929. The marriage ended in divorce. His second wife Thalassa Cruso was a well-known television presenter. They met in Ireland, where both O'Neill Hencken and Cruso, a student of Mortimer Wheeler, were excavating, and married in London on October 12, 1935. They had three daughters. Thalassa died in Wellesley, MA on June 11, 1997. She was buried at Newton Cemetery, MA.
