= Liam Pilkington =

Irish revolutionary (1894–1977)

- Born: 2 June 1894; Sligo, County Sligo, Ireland
- Died: 26 March 1977 (aged 82); Liverpool, England
- Military career
- Allegiance: IRA; Anti-Treaty IRA
- Service years: 1917–23
- Rank: General
- Unit: 35th Battalion (County Sligo Battalion)
- Commands: Officer Commanding, Sligo Brigade, IRA; General Officer Commanding, 3rd Western Division, Anti-Treaty IRA, 1921–1923
- Conflicts: Irish War of Independence; Irish Civil War
- Other work: Catholic priest

Liam Pilkington (2 June 1894 – 26 March 1977), also known as William Pilkington and Billy Pilkington, was a member of the IRA during the Irish War of Independence. Pilkington was General Officer Commanding (GOC) of the 3rd Western Division, IRA, from 1921 to 1923. After the conclusion of the Irish War of Independence Pilkington joined the Anti-Treaty IRA during the Irish Civil War. He attempted to become a politician for a short while, but was ultimately unsuccessful. Disillusioned due to the Irish Civil War, Pilkington became a Catholic priest for the remainder of his life. He served as a priest in South Africa and Wales before retiring to Liverpool, England, where he died.

== Early life ==
Pilkington was born in Sligo on 2 June 1894 to Margaret Mary Pilkington (née Torsney) and John Pilkington. He was the second of twelve children born to the couple. Only nine of Pilkington's siblings survived into adulthood. He received his education at the local Marist Brothers' convent school and the Day Trades Preparatory School. Later he was a student at the Department of Agriculture Forestry College in County Wicklow. When the Irish War of Independence began, the college was closed and Pilkington was forced to return to Sligo. He then gained employment with Wehrly Brothers Ltd. (a jewellery and watchmaking store) in Sligo.

== Military career ==
Several notable incidents occurred in Pilkington's military career. On 25 October 1920 at Moneygold, eight miles from Sligo (between Grange and Cliffony), IRA men led by him ambushed a nine-man Royal Irish Constabulary patrol, killing four (Sergeant Patrick Perry, Constable Patrick Keown, Constable Patrick Laffey, Constable Patrick Lynch) and wounding two others (Constables Clarke and O'Rourke). In January 1922 Pilkington made clear his opposition to the IRAs General Headquarters (GHQ) support for the Anglo-Irish Treaty "We intend to cut away from this headquarters, all of you (pointing to the staff and officers of the GHQ) want to build up a Free State Army so you can march in step into the British Empire. Do it openly. We stand by the Republic." On 6 April 1922, a meeting addressed by Arthur Griffith in Sligo, had been proclaimed illegal by Pilkington, who was the local Anti-Treaty IRA divisional commander. Pilkington's troops took over a number of buildings in the town. Sean MacEoin brought Provisional Government troops from Athlone and on the day of the meeting, he was joined by further troops led by JJ "Ginger" O'Connell. A tense situation ensued but, at the last minute, Pilkington backed down and the meeting went ahead. On 4 September 1922, an Anti-Treaty IRA unit under Pilkington took the Dromhaire barracks in County Sligo after the Free State garrison surrendered.

== Political career ==
On 27 August 1923, Pilkington ran unsuccessfully in the general election for the 4th Dáil as a Republican candidate, polling 2089 first preference votes.

== Anti-Treaty IRA ==
Pilkington was a prominent member of the Anti-Treaty IRA for many years, but his most important role as part of the Anti-Treaty IRA came on 20 April 1923. The Executive of Anti-Treaty IRA met in Poulacappal (four miles southwest of Callan and three miles from Mullinahone). Present were Frank Aiken, Liam Pilkington (replacing Liam Lynch), Sean Hyde, Sean Dowling, Bill Quirke, Tom Barry, Tom Ruane (replacing Michael Kilroy), Tom Sullivan (replacing Sean Lehane), Sean McSwiney, Tom Crofts, P. J. Ruttledge and Sean O'Meara (substitute for Seamus Robinson). Frank Aiken was elected Chief-of-Staff and an Army Council of Aiken, Pilkington and Barry was appointed, although Macardle says that Sean Hyde was also included. Aiken proposed that peace should be made with the Pro-Treaty Government on the basis that "The sovereignty of the Irish Nation and the integrity of its territory is inalienable". This was passed by nine votes to two.

== Catholic priest ==
Pilkington became a Catholic priest after his foray into politics and due to the disillusionment of the Irish War of Independence. He joined the Redemptorist Order and became known as Father William Pilkington CSsR. Pilkington served as a priest in the Diocese of Cape Town, South Africa, priest of Monmouthshire, Wales, and retired to the Redemptorist house at Bishop Eton, Liverpool, where he died in 1977.

== Later life, death and legacy ==
In 1954 he was guest of honour at a dinner sponsored by Clan na Gael and the IRA Veterans of America in New York where he said he was returning to the mission fields of Africa, but he remained faithful to the All Ireland Republic. He died on 26 March 1977 and was buried in Liverpool.
