= Harvard Irish Mission =

Academic study in the 1930s

Between the years 1932 and 1936 a team of American academics from Harvard University, Massachusetts, led by Earnest Hooton conducted a pioneering anthropological study of Ireland, north and south, which was called the Harvard Irish Mission. The Mission comprised three strands; social anthropology, physical anthropology and archaeology. The results of the study were published in a series of academics papers and monographs between in 1936 and 1955. The Mission had a major influence on the development of academic knowledge in and about Ireland and many of the publications continue to be cited by modern scholars across a wide range of disciplines. C. Arensberg and S. Kimball came to the west of Ireland as part of the ‘Harvard Irish Project’. The Irish research project was part of a larger comparative project using ethnographic methods of investigation.

== The Name ==
The name of the study is referred to by a number of labels in academic and popular media, including "Harvard Irish Survey" and "Harvard Irish Mission". The archaeological section, in particular, was and still is frequently referred to as the "Harvard Archaeological Expedition to Ireland". However, the official name of the study was the "Harvard Irish Mission".

== Major Publications resulting from the Mission ==
- Conrad M. Arensberg, The Irish Countryman Macmillan Company (1937), reissued by Waveland (1988) ISBN 0-8813-3401-4
- Conrad M. Arensberg and Solon Toothaker Kimball, Family and Community in Ireland. Harvard University Press (1940, reissued 1968) ISBN 0-674-29250-2
- Hallam L. Movius, The Irish Stone Age; its Chronology, Development and Relationships. Cambridge University Press (1942, reissued 2013) ISBN 1-1076-9300-4
- Earnest Hooton and C. Wesley Dupertuis, with Helen Hooton Dawson, The Physical Anthropology of Ireland. Papers of the Peabody Museum of Archaeology and Ethnology, Harvard, XXX, 1955. Two volumes.
