= 2006 Sligo Senior Football Championship =

Gaelic football competition

Tournament details
- County: Sligo
- Year: 2006

Winners
- Champions: Curry (6th win)
- Manager: Denis Kearney
- Captain: Sean Davey

Promotion/Relegation
- Promoted team(s): Geevagh
- Relegated team(s): Coolaney/Mullinabreena, St. Molaise Gaels

This is a round-up of the 2006 Sligo Senior Football Championship. The reigning champions, Coolera/Strandhill, who were surprisingly eliminated at the group stage, after losing a playoff tie to neighbours St. John's. Geevagh won the 2006 Sligo Intermediate Football Championship with a victory over St Patrick's and therefore will take part in the 2007 Championship. Curry won the 2006 title, claiming their 6th title in all, by beating Bunninadden in the final.

== Group stages ==
The Championship was contested by 16 teams, divided into four groups of four. The top two sides in each group advanced to the quarter-finals, with the remaining sides facing the Relegation playoffs to secure Senior status for 2007.

=== Group A ===
Date	Venue	Team A	Score	Team B	Score
22 July	Markievicz Park	Drumcliffe/Rosses Point	3-7	St. Mary's	2-10
23 July	Tubbercurry	Ballymote	0-9	Eastern Harps	0-9
29 July	Ballymote	Eastern Harps	1-14	Drumcliffe/Rosses Point	1-7
30 July	Markievicz Park	St. Mary's	0-9	Ballymote	0-8
12 August	Markeivicz Park	Eastern Harps	1-9	St. Mary's	0-7
12 August	Kent Park	Drumcliffe/Rosses Point	2-10	Ballymote	1-9

Team	Pld	W	D	L	For	Against	Pts
Eastern Harps	3	2	1	0	2-32	1-23	5
Drumcliffe/Rosses Point	3	1	1	1	6-24	4-33	3
St. Mary's	3	1	1	1	2-26	4-24	3
Ballymote	3	0	1	2	1-26	2-28	1

=== Group B ===
Date	Venue	Team A	Score	Team B	Score
22 July	Enniscrone	Easkey	1-10	Tourlestrane	0-8
22 July	Ballymote	Calry/St. Joseph's	1-7	Shamrock Gaels	0-10
29 July	Ballymote	Tourlestrane	4-11	Shamrock Gaels	1-6
29 July	Kent Park	Easkey	3-14	Calry/St. Joseph's	1-10
12 August	Ballymote	Tourlestrane	4-15	Calry/St. Joseph's	0-8
12 August	Tubbercurry	Easkey	2-13	Shamrock Gaels	0-9

Team	Pld	W	D	L	For	Against	Pts
Easkey	3	3	0	0	6-37	1-27	6
Tourlestrane	3	2	0	1	8-34	2-24	4
Shamrock Gaels	3	0	1	2	1-25	7-31	1
Calry/St. Joseph's	3	0	1	2	2-25	7-39	1

=== Group C ===
Date	Venue	Team A	Score	Team B	Score
22 July	Kent Park	Coolera/Strandhill	1-9	St. Molaise Gaels	0-8
22 July	Ballymote	St. John's	2-10	Tubbercurry	1-10
29 July	Kent Park	St. Molaise Gaels	0-12	St. John's	0-7
30 July	Enniscrone	Tubbercurry	0-12	Coolera/Strandhill	1-7
13 August	Markievicz Park	Coolera/Strandhill	1-11	St. John's	2-8
13 August	Kent Park	Tubbercurry	4-14	St. Molaise Gaels	1-6

Team	Pld	W	D	L	For	Against	Pts
Tubbercurry	3	2	0	1	5-34	4-23	4
Coolera/Strandhill	3	1	1	1	3-27	2-28	3
St. John's	3	1	1	1	4-25	2-33	3
St. Molaise Gaels	3	1	0	2	1-26	5-30	1

=== Group D ===
Date	Venue	Team A	Score	Team B	Score
23 July	Tubbercurry	Bunninadden	2-9	Castleconnor	1-10
23 July	Tourlestrane	Curry	2-16	Coolaney/Mullinabreena	0-4
29 July	Tubbercurry	Castleconnor	1-12	Coolaney/Mullinabreena	3-6
30 July	Markievicz Park	Curry	0-12	Bunninadden	0-10
13 August	Tubbercurry	Bunninadden	2-15	Coolaney/Mullinabreena	0-3
13 August	Easkey	Curry	0-11	Castleconnor	0-6

Team	Pld	W	D	L	For	Against	Pts
Curry	3	3	0	0	2-39	0-20	6
Bunninadden	3	2	0	1	4-34	1-25	4
Castleconnor	3	0	1	2	2-28	5-26	1
Coolaney/Mullinabreena	3	0	1	2	3-13	5-43	1

=== Playoffs ===
Two groups required playoffs to decide the remaining Quarter-Final places. In Group A St. Mary's, inspired by Mark Breheny, defeated Drumcliffe/Rosses Point to qualify to face Easkey in the last eight. The other playoff produced a major upset as holders Coolera/Strandhill crashed out, beaten by neighbours St. John's in the Group C playoff. Coolera had led by six points at one stage in the second half but St. John's scored two late goals, and booked a meeting with Curry in the quarter-finals.

Group	Date	Venue	Team A	Score	Team B	Score
Group A	20 August	Markievicz Park	St. Mary's	0-14	Drumcliffe/Rosses Point	0-10
Group C	20 August	Markievicz Park	St. John's	2-4	Coolera/Strandhill	1-5

== Quarterfinals ==
The quarter finals of the Championship saw the exit of Tourlestrane, St. John's, Easkey and Tubbercurry. Eastern Harps, Curry, St. Mary's and Bunninadden qualified for the semi-finals. The quarter finals had one drawn game, Eastern Harps and Tourlestrane finishing level after a tense encounter. Harps won the replay a week later.

Game	Date	Venue	Team A	Score	Team B	Score
Sligo SFC; Quarter Final	26 August	Markievicz Park	Bunninadden	0-13	Tubbercurry	1-8
Sligo SFC; Quarter Final	26 August	Markievicz Park	Curry	2-12	St. John's	1-6
Sligo SFC; Quarter Final	27 August	Markievicz Park	St. Mary's	1-10	Easkey	1-7
Sligo SFC; Quarter Final	27 August	Markievicz Park	Eastern Harps	0-8	Tourlestrane	0-8
Sligo SFC; Quarter Final Replay	3 September	Tubbercurry	Eastern Harps	2-9	Tourlestrane	2-7

== Semifinals ==
The semi-finals saw Curry and Bunninadden emerge victorious, and qualify for the 24 September decider. Bunninadden recorded a famous win over neighbours Eastern Harps, whom many expected to reach the final. In the second Semi-Final, Curry, with the Marren brothers, Jason and Adrian, both on form, saw off St. Mary's by a three-point margin.

Game	Date	Venue	Team A	Score	Team B	Score
Sligo SFC; Semi-Final	10 September	Markievicz Park	Bunninadden	0-10	Eastern Harps	0-9
Sligo SFC; Semi-Final	10 September	Markievicz Park	Curry	1-11	St. Mary's	1-8

== Last eight ==
Quarterfinals; 26 August/August 27
Bunninadden	0-13
Tubbercurry	1-8
Eastern Harps	0-8, 2-9 (R)
Tourlestrane	0-8, 2-7 (R)
Curry	2-12
St. John's	1-6
St. Mary's	1-11
Easkey	1-8

Semifinals; 10 September
Bunninadden	0-10
Eastern Harps	0-9
Curry	1-11
St. Mary's	1-8

Final; 24 September
Bunninadden	2-9
Curry	1-15

== Sligo Senior Football Championship Final ==
Curry	1-15 - 2-9 (final score after 60 minutes)	Bunninadden
Manager:Denis Kearney Team: J. Durcan; P. Walsh; J. Hayes; B. Collins; S. Haran; J. Feeney; S. Marren; G. Maye; B. McDonagh; S. Davey (0-3); K. Morley (1-1); K. Giblin; J. Marren (0-1); A. Marren (0-8); D. McDonagh Substitutes: A. Brennan (0-2); P. Durcan; S. Colleary	Half-time: 0-4 2-4 Competition: Sligo Senior Football Championship (Final) Date: 15.30 BST; Sunday, 24 September 2006 Venue: Markievicz Park, Sligo Referee: Marty Duffy (Enniscrone) Match rules: 60 minutes. Replay if scores still level. Maximum of 5 substitutions.	Manager:Brian Touhy Team: D. Flannery; P. McGettrick; S. Roddy; T. Gormley; B. Gilhooley; E. Gilhooley; S. Leamy; P. Doohan (0-2); F. O'Flaherty (0-1); L. Óg Gormley; Mark Gormley (0-1); Michael Gormley; S. McHugh (2-0); K. Kerins (0-1); W. Gormley (0-3) Substitutes: T. McLoughlin (0-1); T. Davey; J. O'Flaherty; S. Kerins; A. Killoran

== Relegation ==
Due to the restructuring of the Senior Championship, in order to reduce the number of teams to 12 by 2009, two teams were to be relegated from the 2006 Championship, with one being promoted from the Intermediate ranks. The loser of each game progresses to the next round, the losers of the relegation finals will play in the Sligo Intermediate Football Championship in 2007. Coolaney/Mullinabreena and St. Molaise Gaels were the two sides that made the drop.

Game	Date	Venue	Team A	Score	Team B	Score
Sligo SFC; Relegation Playoff	26 August	Kent Park	Shamrock Gaels	0-16	St. Molaise Gaels	2-6
Sligo SFC; Relegation Playoff	26 August	Grange	Calry/St. Joseph's	1-11	Drumcliffe/Rosses Point	1-10
Sligo SFC; Relegation Playoff	27 August	Ransboro	Coolera/Strandhill	1-12	Ballymote	1-4
Sligo SFC; Relegation Playoff	27 August	Tubbercurry	Castleconnor	0-13	Coolaney/Mullinabreena	0-4
Sligo SFC; Relegation Final	2 September	Kent Park	Ballymote	1-14	St. Molaise Gaels	0-7
Sligo SFC; Relegation Final	2 September	Ballymote	Drumcliffe/Rosses Point	2-9	Coolaney/Mullinabreena	0-7
