= 2007 Sligo Senior Football Championship =

Gaelic football competition

Tournament details
- County: Sligo
- Year: 2007

Winners
- Champions: Tourlestrane (8th win)
- Manager: Michael Henry
- Captain: Eamonn O'Hara

Promotion/Relegation
- Promoted team(s): St. Farnan's
- Relegated team(s): n/a

This is a round-up of the 2007 Sligo Senior Football Championship. Tourlestrane claimed their eighth title in this year, and fifth since 1994, defeating Eastern Harps in the final by two points, despite the absence of captain and star player Eamon O'Hara. The holders Curry fell to a surprisingly heavy defeat to outsiders St. John's in a quarter-final second replay.

== Group stages ==
The Championship was contested by 15 teams, divided into four groups. The top two sides in each group advanced to the quarter-finals, with the remaining sides facing the Relegation playoffs to retain Senior status for 2008.

=== Group A ===
Date	Venue	Team A	Score	Team B	Score
14 July	Enniscrone	St. John's	0-14	Castleconnor	0-6
14 July	Tubbercurry	Eastern Harps	1-14	St. Mary's	0-8
18 August	Curry	Eastern Harps	1-10	Castleconnor	0-3
18 August	Markievicz Park	St. John's	1-9	St. Mary's	1-8
25 August	Markeivicz Park	Eastern Harps	1-11	St. John's	0-6
25 August	Enniscrone	St. Mary's	5-10	Castleconnor	0-5

Team	Pld	W	D	L	For	Against	Pts
Eastern Harps	3	3	0	0	3-35	0-17	6
St. John's	3	2	0	1	1-29	2-25	4
St. Mary's	3	1	0	2	6-26	2-28	2
Castleconnor	3	0	0	3	0-14	6-34	0

=== Group B ===
Date	Venue	Team A	Score	Team B	Score
14 July	Tourlestrane	Curry	0-11	Tubbercurry	0-9
14 July	Markievicz Park	Coolera/Strandhill	1-11	Ballymote	0-9
18 August	Ballymote	Coolera/Strandhill	0-9	Tubbercurry	0-9
18 August	Tubbercurry	Curry	1-11	Ballymote	0-11
25 August	Tubbercurry	Curry	2-14	Coolera/Strandhill	0-8
25 August	Markievicz Park	Tubbercurry	1-20	Ballymote	0-11

Team	Pld	W	D	L	For	Against	Pts
Curry	3	3	0	0	3-36	0-28	6
Tubbercurry	3	1	1	1	1-38	0-31	3
Coolera/Strandhill	3	1	1	1	1-28	2-32	3
Ballymote	3	0	0	3	0-31	3-42	0

=== Group C ===
Date	Venue	Team A	Score	Team B	Score
14 July	Kent Park	Drumcliffe/Rosses Point	0-13	Easkey	2-7
14 July	Ballymote	Geevagh	0-11	Shamrock Gaels	0-11
18 August	Markievicz Park	Drumcliffe/Rosses Point	2-10	Geevagh	1-10
18 August	Enniscrone	Easkey	3-11	Shamrock Gaels	0-11
25 August	Ballymote	Drumcliffe/Rosses Point	2-5	Shamrock Gaels	1-8
25 August	Ennicrone	Easkey	1-12	Geevagh	1-10

Team	Pld	W	D	L	For	Against	Pts
Easkey	3	2	1	0	6-30	1-34	5
Drumcliffe/Rosses Point	3	1	2	0	4-28	4-25	4
Shamrock Gaels	3	0	2	1	1-30	5-27	2
Geevagh	3	0	1	2	2-31	3-33	1

=== Group D ===
Date	Venue	Team A	Score	Team B	Score
15 July	Markievicz Park	Calry/St. Joseph's	2-9	Bunninadden	0-11
18 August	Tubbercurry	Tourlestrane	2-17	Bunninadden	2-3
1 September	Ballymote	Tourlestrane	4-9	Calry/St. Joseph's	0-9

Team	Pld	W	D	L	For	Against	Pts
Tourlestrane	2	2	0	0	6-26	2-12	4
Calry/St. Joseph's	2	1	0	1	2-18	4-20	2
Bunninadden	2	0	0	2	2-14	4-26	0

== Quarterfinals ==
Game	Date	Venue	Team A	Score	Team B	Score
Sligo SFC; Quarter Final	8 September	Markievicz Park	Eastern Harps	0-13	Tubbercurry	1-5
Sligo SFC; Quarter Final	8 September	Tubbercurry	Tourlestrane	1-15	Drumcliffe/Rosses Point	0-4
Sligo SFC; Quarter Final	9 September	Markievicz Park	St. John's	0-10	Curry	0-10
Sligo SFC; Quarter Final	9 September	Tubbercurry	Easkey	0-11	Calry/St. Joseph's	0-9
Sligo SFC; Quarter Final Replay (AET)	15 September	Markievicz Park	St. John's	0-13	Curry	0-13
Sligo SFC; Quarter Final Second Replay	23 September	Tubbercurry	St. John's	4-15	Curry	0-7

== Semifinals ==
Game	Date	Venue	Team A	Score	Team B	Score
Sligo SFC; Semi-Final	23 September	Markievicz Park	Eastern Harps	0-10	Easkey	0-10
Sligo SFC; Semi-Final	30 September	Tubbercurry	Tourlestrane	1-11	St. John's	0-9
Sligo SFC; Semi-Final Replay	30 September	Tubbercurry	Eastern Harps	1-13	Easkey	0-6

== Last eight ==
Quarterfinals; 8 September/September 9
Eastern Harps	0-13
Tubbercurry	1-5
Easkey	0-11
Calry/St. Joseph's	0-9
Curry	0-10, 0-13 (R), 0-7 (R2)
St. John's	0-10, 0-13 (R), 4-15 (R2)
Tourlestrane	1-15
Drumcliffe/Rosses Point	0-4

Semifinals; 23/30 September
Eastern Harps	0-10, 1-13 (R)
Easkey	0-10, 0-6 (R)
St. John's	0-9
Tourlestrane	1-11

Final; 7 October
Eastern Harps	0-10
Tourlestrane	1-9

== Sligo Senior Football Championship Final ==
Tourlestrane	1-9 - 0-10 (final score after 60 minutes)	Eastern Harps
Manager:Michael Henry Team: S. Gildea; S. King; E. Haran; C. Neary; E. Kelly; B. Kennedy; D. Durkin; B. Egan; A. McIntyre; G. Gaughan; S. Henry; T. Henry (1-0); G. McGowan (0-7); J. Marren (0-1); S. Dunne Substitutes: M. Walsh (0-1); J. Leonard; N. Egan; M. Henry	Half-time: 1-5 - 0-4 Competition: Sligo Senior Football Championship (Final) Date: 15.30 BST; Sunday, 7 October 2007 Venue: Markievicz Park, Sligo Referee: Dermot Mullaney (Enniscrone)	Manager:Denis Johnson Team: P. Walsh; K. Cryan; R. Donovan; P. Rafferty; P. McGovern (Capt); B. Phillips; K. Gallagher; T. Cryan (0-1); K. Phillips (0-1); S. King; K. Carty; D. O'Grady (0-1); J. Rafferty; R. Hannon (0-6); M. Doddy (0-1) Substitutes: S. Gallagher; S. Dorrian; M. Cosgrove

== Relegation ==
The relegation playoffs saw Geevagh and Shamrock Gaels relegated, however the latter claimed that an oversight had been made, regarding the matter of points gained in the Championship itself being carried over into the playoff groups, which was not applied by the county's Activities Committee, but which the GAA's Official Guide stated should be the case. This case was successful, subsequently no team was relegated for the 2008 season, and the Championship restructuring was delayed as a result.

Game	Date	Venue	Team A	Score	Team B	Score
Sligo SFC; Relegation Playoff	1 September	Bunninadden	Ballymote	3-13	Shamrock Gaels	2-9
Sligo SFC; Relegation Playoff	2 September	Markievicz Park	Castleconnor	2-7	Coolera/Strandhill	1-6
Sligo SFC; Relegation Playoff	2 September	Tubbercurry	St. Mary's	2-9	Bunninadden	2-7
Sligo SFC; Relegation Playoff	8 September	Curry	Castleconnor	0-11	Ballymote	0-10
Sligo SFC; Relegation Playoff	9 September	Grange	Coolera/Strandhill	3-9	Shamrock Gaels	0-9
Sligo SFC; Relegation Playoff	9 September	Ballymote	St. Mary's	2-8	Geevagh	1-11
Sligo SFC; Relegation Playoff	22 September	Curry	Coolera/Strandhill	4-6	Ballymote	3-9
Sligo SFC; Relegation Playoff	22 September	Tubbercurry	Bunninadden	1-14	Geevagh	2-3

=== Group A ===
Team	Pld	W	D	L	For	Against	Pts
Castleconnor	2	2	0	0	2-18	1-16	4
Ballymote	3	1	1	1	6-32	6-26	3
Coolera/Strandhill	3	1	1	1	8-21	5-25	3
Shamrock Gaels	2	0	0	2	2-18	6-22	0

=== Group B ===
Team	Pld	W	D	L	For	Against	Pts
St. Mary's	2	1	1	0	4-17	3-18	3
Bunninadden	2	1	0	1	3-21	4-12	2
Geevagh	2	0	1	1	3-14	3-22	1
