= Mainchín =

Manchán, Mainchín, Manchéne and a variety of other spellings may refer to:

== Places ==
- Manaccan, south Cornwall, England, United Kingdom.

== People ==
=== Saints ===
- Ireland
  - Mainchín of Limerick (fl. late 6th century), son of Sétna, patron saint of Limerick. Feast day: 29 December.
  - Manchán of Lemanaghan (d. 665), son of Sillán, patron of Liath Mancháin, now Lemanaghan, in County Offaly. Feast day: 20 or 24 January.
  - Manchán of Min Droichit (d. 652), also Manchéne, scholar and abbot of Min Droichit (Co. Offaly). Feast day: 2 January.
  - Mainchín of Corann, son of Collán. Feast day: 13 January.
  - Manchán of Mohill, (d. 538), linked to Mohill, co. Leitrim and his Shrine. Feast day: 14 February
  - Manchán of Athleague, (fl. 500), patron saint of Athleague, county Roscommon. Invoked against disease.
- Scotland
  - St Machan, 12th century Scottish Saint.
- Wales
  - Mawgan, Meugan, Meigant, (fl. 5th or 6th century), refers to one or two Brythonic saints of Cornwall/Brittany (Mawgan) and Wales (Meugan).
  - Mannacus, 6th century, Caer Gybi (fort) in Wales.

=== First name ===
- Manchán Magan (1970–2025), Irish author, traveller, broadcaster and documentary maker
