= Monastery of Inisnag =

Irish Christian monastery and church

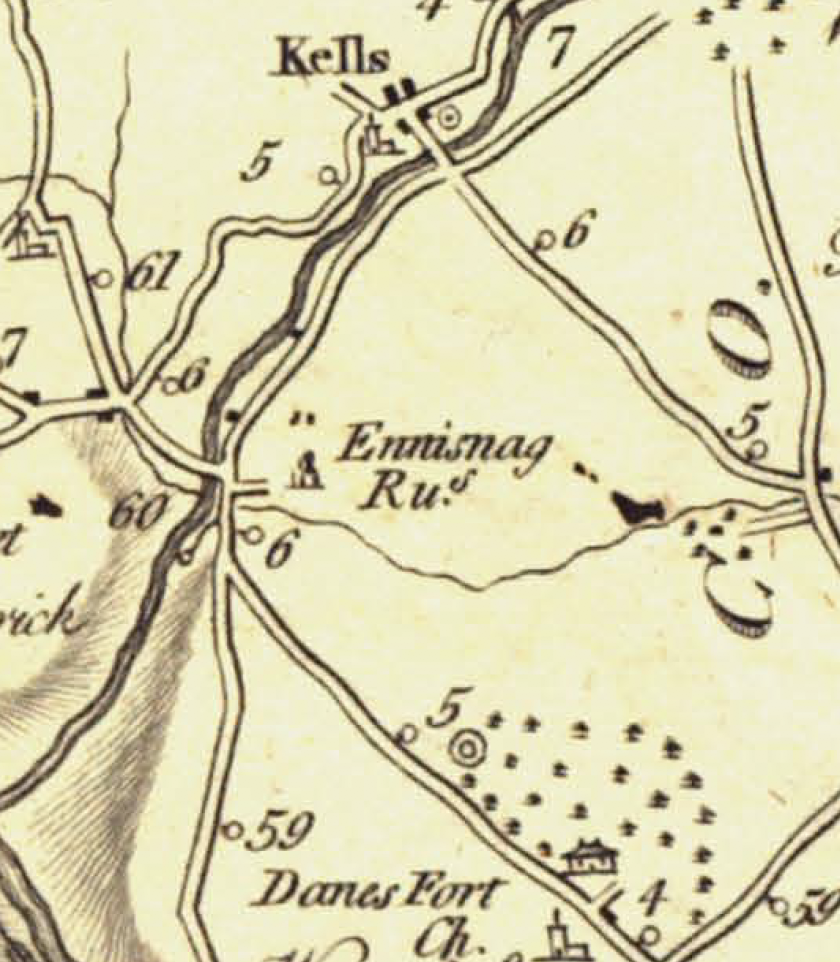

- Location within Ireland
- Interactive map of Monastery of Inisnag

Monastery information
- Other names: Inis-Snaig, Ennisnag
- Established: 5th or 6th century
- Disestablished: 16th century
- Dedication: Saint Manchan
- Diocese: Diocese of Ossory

People
- Founder: Saint Manchan

Site
- Location: County Kilkenny
- Country: Ireland
- Coordinates: 52.553214°N 7.2355099°W
- Visible remains: no trace
- Public access: Yes

The Monastery of Ennisnag (Middle English: Inisnag and Irish: Inis Snaig meaning "the Island or Islet of the Crane or Heron") was an early Irish Christian monastery, and later a medieval prebendal church, located at Ennisnag, in County Kilkenny, Ireland. The medieval monastery and church are no longer extant. From the ruins, St Peter's church, of Protestant denomination, was established in the early 19th century.

== Monastery of Inis-Snaig ==
Little is known about the monastic community here. Canon William Carrigan suggested "an ancient Church stood on the site from time immemorial to after the Cromwellian era". John O'Hanlon reported that Diocese of Ossory ecclesiastical records names Saint Manchan as patron saint writing "at Inisnag, diocese of Ossory, St. Manchan, whose feast occurs on the 14th of February, was venerated as a patron (Statuta Dioecesis Ossoriensis)". This implies the church was founded in the fifth, or early sixth century. The monastery of Inis-Snaig was probably small in scale.

Modern tradition names Máedóc of Ferns as patron saint of Ennisnag though the claim "his feast day was celebrated here on the 14th of February" suggests confusion regarding patron Saints. (Note: In the Old Calendar 14 February is the feast day of Saint Manchan, not Máedóc of Ferns (29 January). The foundation by Manchan would date the early church to late 5th century or first decades of the 6th century.) Nevertheless, his holy well, called Tobermogue (Irish: Tobair Mogue), is preserved.

The Annals of the Four Masters has an entry for AD745, recalling the "battle of Inis Snaig", between "Anmchaidh mac Cucearca", king of Osraighe, and an unknown opponent, and an entry for AD 889, "the death of "Suadhbhar mac Coitceadhach, of Inis Snaig, died an anchorite", confirming the early Christian Irish monastery of Inis Snaig flourished in at least the ninth century, but probably from the early Middle Ages to sometime before, or after, the Norman invasion of the 12th century.

== Prebend of Inisnag ==
The church of Inisnag was recorded as prebendal of Ossory diocese, in the Taxatio Ecclesiastica of AD 1291–1292. The Treasurer of the Diocesan Chapter of Ossory, possessed the prebend of Ennisnag from the 15th century. This Diocesan Chapter, consisted of a Dean, Archdeacon, Chancellor, precentor and Treasurer, is traceable back to Felix O'Dulaney (1178–1202), the late 12th century onwards. The prebendal church of Ennisnag is included in the list of churches, or parishes, possessed by ecclesiastics of the Diocesan Chapter of Ossory, right down to the Protestant Reformation of the 16th century. According to a papal document titled Ecllesia De Inisnage Prebend -£ ix., preserved by the Protestant Bishop of Ossory, with Rev. James Graves once holding a correct transcript of same, the prebend of Inisnag was granted on "the authority of Pope Nicholas IV, 1291 [liber ruber Ossoriensis]".

The medieval church fell into ruins after the Dissolution of the Monasteries, and upheavals of 17th century Ireland.

== Abbots and prebendaries ==
It is impossible to fully catalogue the succession of Abbots, and prebendaries. Nonetheless, the information below is preserved, or inferred.

Floruit abbreviations used for dates:

- aft. = after
- bef. = before
- d. = died in office, or in commendam
- res. = resigned or forfeited office

Dates	Name of holder	Notes
c. aft. 464 – bef. 538	Saint Manchan	Missionary monk, founder, and ancient patron saint.
bef. 889 – 889 (d.)	Suadhbhar mac Coitceadhach	Probably Abbot. Died a recluse.
bef. 1361 – aft. 1361	Richard Gros (Grace)	"Rector, i.e., Canon, of Insnake, November 1361".
1403 – bef. 1409	John Nugent	"chaplain, obtained royal grant of the Prebend of Ensnak" on 12 January 1404.
bef. 1409 – bef. 1419	Maurice Talbot	Possession of the "Prebend of Insnake, on the strength of Apostolic Letters", pardoned by the King, 28 March 1409.
bef. 1419 – 1419 (d.)	John Ocuyrk	The deceased "John Ocuyrk", dean of Ossory, possessed the "canonries and prebends of Inysnak in Ossory" as prebend.
1419 – 1424 (res.)	Nicholas Haket	He had possession of the "Prebendary of Insnake, in the Church of Ossory", on 1 August 1419, succeeding as dean of Ossory, securing the "canonries and prebends of Inysnak in Ossory" as prebend. Nicholas resigned c. AD 1424.
1424 – aft. 1424	Thomas Faunt	Being a canon of Limerick, and priest, secured "the canonry and prebend of Insnak in Ossory, value not exceeding 10 marks", succeeding Haket.

== St Peter's Church ==
In the 19th century, a Protestant church was constructed on this old church site, named St. Peter's Church. Probably the most distinguished rector and resident of Ennisnag was the famous Irish Antiquarian James Graves, who died in 1886.

== See also ==
- List of abbeys and priories in Ireland (County Kilkenny)

== Notes and references ==
=== Primary sources ===
- O'Donovan, John, ed. (1856). Annála Rioghachta Éireann. Annals of the Kingdom of Ireland by the Four Masters ... with a Translation and Copious Notes. 7 vols. Translated by O'Donovan (2nd ed.). Dublin: Royal Irish Academy. CELT editions. Full scans at Internet Archive: Vol. 1; Vol. 2; Vol. 3; Vol. 4; Vol. 5; Vol. 6; Indices.
- Carrigan, William (1905). The History and Antiquities of the Diocese of Ossory. Vol. I. (published by: Рипол Классик, 1981. ed.). Dublin: Sealy, Bryers & Walker, Middle Abbey Street. p. 256. ISBN 978-5-87920-646-3.

=== Secondary sources ===
- Wynne Foot, Arthur (1889). A memoriam paper on James Graves, Secretary and Treasurer of the Royal Historical and Archaeological Association of Ireland, formerly the Kilkenny Archeological Society (PDF). Vol. The journal of the Royal Society of Antiquaries of Ireland, Volume VIII, fourth series (1887-1888 ed.). Dublin: Royal Society of Antiquaries of Ireland, Dublin: University Press, by Ponsoney and Welrick. pp. 8–23.
- O'Hanlon, John (1875). Lives of the Irish Saints: with special festivals, and the commemorations of holy persons (PDF). Internet Archive is non-profit library of millions of free books, and more.: Dublin : J. Duffy. p. 1.
- MacShamhráin, Ailbhe (2008–2009). "Inis Snaig" (Compiled October 2003 to January 2007, revised and expanded with fuller bibliography, February 2007 to August 2008, Online ed.). DIAS.
- Lanigan, John (1829). The Irish Church (ed.). An Ecclesiastical History of Ireland, from the first introduction of Christianity among the Irish, to the beginning of the thirteenth century. Vol. III (second ed.). Dublin: J. Cumming, 16, L. Ormond-Quay; London: Simpkin and Marshall; Edinburgh: R. Cadell and Co. pp. 30–32.
- Wall, James Charles (1905). J. Charles Cox (ed.). Shrines of British Saints, with numerous illustrations (PDF). Methuen & Co., 36 Essex Street WC, London, England. p. 83. (subscription required)
- Twemlow, J A (1906). "Calendar of Papal Registers Relating To Great Britain and Ireland" (Lateran Regesta 211: 1420-1422 ed.). pp. 163–168.
- Twemlow, J A (1906). "Calendar of Papal Registers Relating To Great Britain and Ireland" (Lateran Regesta 241: 1424 ed.). pp. 355–357.
- Sheridan, Donal; Kirwan, Bernie (2011). "Graveyward of St. Peters Church, Ennisnag" (Online, www.historicgraves.com ed.). Historic Graves project.
