= Maonacan of Athleague =

6th-century Irish Christian monk and saint

Saint Maonacan of Athleague
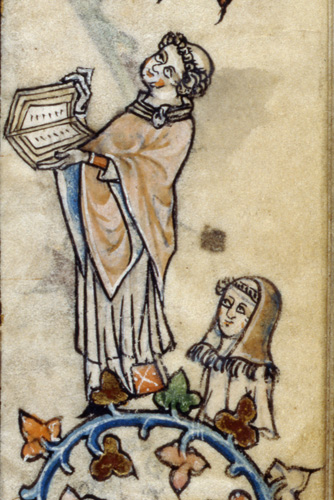
- Manchán, "a monk"
- Born: bef. 500; Ireland
- Died: aft. 500; Ireland
- Venerated in: Roman Catholic Church; Anglican Communion
- Feast: 18 February (7 February in Julian calendar)
- Patronage: Athleague invoked against plague

Saint Maonacan, otherwise Manchan (Irish: Manchán, Middle English: Mancheanus, Maenucan, Maonacan, Moenagain, fl. A.D. 500) of Athleague (Irish: Ath-Liag, "the stony-ford of St. Manchan" or "ford of flagstones", death 6th century), was an early Irish Christian saint. He founded a church in Athleague, in county Roscommon. Saint Manchan's feast day is celebrated on February 18 (February 7 in the Old Calendar), by Roman Catholics, and Anglicans. The life of Manchan of Athleague is obscured because many persons named Manchan are to be found among the monastically inclined medieval Irish Christians.

== Life ==
Nothing is known about the life of Manchán of Athleague. The period of this saint is unknown. He founded an early Christian monastery of Athleague, in county Roscommon. Moran provides the following local perspective:-

- "Another saint, Fionn Monganan is recorded as the true patron saint of Athleague and the village was known as Athliag Monganan in the earliest annals. His powers of keeping pestilence and disease at bay is also remembered and the site of his hallowed cell is near the present Angling Centre beside the former ford." (Note: The name "Fionn Monganan" is mistaken, because "Fionn" relates to "Ath-Liag-Finn", otherwise Ballyleague, not Ath-Liag-Manchain. The name "Saint Monganan" is just another corruption of Mainchín.)

The sanctity of Manchán of Athleague is first recorded in the Annals of the Four Masters which records "A.D. 1493, .. Irish: Ath Liacc Maenaccáin (Middle English: Ath liag-Maenagain)", which confirms he was patron saint of Athleague, in County Roscommon. The "Martyrology of Donegal" records the Saint as "Latin: Maonacan Atha liacc, 7 Feb., Maonacan, of Ath-liacc", while "The martyrology of Gorman" notes "Moenucan, of Ath liacc, Feb. 7. Latin: Maenucan, Mart. Taml.".

The multiplicity of Saints called Maenucan, Maonacan, Moenagain Irish: Manchán, Manachán, Mainchéin, Mainchin, Monahan Latin: Manchianus, Manichchaeus is because the name is a diminutive of Irish: Manach Latin: Monachus, a monk, so the real names of each recorded Saint Manchan are unknown. Saint Manchan of Athleague was contemporary with the Twelve Apostles of Ireland, and Manchan of Mohill, as the establishment of the early Christian site of Athleague is given as c. A.D. 500. The Annals of the Four Masters calls Athleague the medieval names of- "Middle English: Athliag Maenagan, and Irish: Atha Liacc Maonaccan".

== Church ==
The Irish Annals has the following entries for the church of Atha Liacc-

- "1235.29 The church of an Druimne at Athleague was burnt, & the charters(?) & all books of the Canons", Irish: "Eclus na Drumne Atha Liacc do loscad & carta & libuir na cananach uli".
- "M1266.2 and Maelisa O'Hanainn, Prior of Roscommon and Athleague, died", Irish: "agus Maoil Isu Ua h-Anainn prioir Rosa Commain, & Atha Liacc, do écc".
- "1266.9 Mael Isa O hAnainn, Prior of Roscommon and Athleague, rested in Christ", and Irish: "Mael Iso h. hAnainn prioir Rosa Coman & Atha Liacc quieuit in Christo".

== Notes and references ==
=== Primary sources ===
- Joyce, Patrick Weston (1910). The origin and history of Irish names of places (PDF). Vol. 1. London Longmans, Green. p. 355.

=== Secondary sources ===
- Graves, James (1874). "The Church and Shrine of St. Manchán". The Journal of the Royal Historical and Archaeological Association of Ireland. 3 (18): 134–50. JSTOR 25506649. (subscription required)
- O'Donovan, John, ed. (1856). Annála Rioghachta Éireann. Annals of the Kingdom of Ireland by the Four Masters ... with a Translation and Copious Notes. 7 vols. Translated by O'Donovan (2nd ed.). Dublin: Royal Irish Academy. CELT editions. Full scans at Internet Archive: Vol. 1; Vol. 2; Vol. 3; Vol. 4; Vol. 5; Vol. 6; Indices.
- Bambury, Pádraig (2008). Ciara Hogan (ed.). "Annála Connacht" (Electronic edition compiled by the CELT Team (2001)(2008), 2nd draft ed.). CELT: Corpus of Electronic Texts: a project of University College Cork College Road, Cork, Ireland—http://www.ucc.ie/celt.
- Wall, James Charles (1905). J. Charles Cox (ed.). Shrines of British Saints, with numerous illustrations (PDF). Methuen & Co., 36 Essex Street WC, London, England. p. 83. (subscription required)
- O'Clery, Michael; O'Donovan, John; Reeves, William; Todd, James Henthorn (1864). The martyrology of Donegal: a calendar of the saints of Ireland (PDF). Oxford University: Dublin : Printed for the Irish Archaeological and Celtic Society by A. Thom. p. 504.
- Hogan, Edmund (1999). "Onomasticon Goedelicum". Documents of Ireland Project, University College Cork. p. 1.
- Gormáin, Félire Húi; Stokes, Whitley (1895). The martyrology of Gorman: edited from a manuscript in the Royal Library Brussels (PDF). London : [Henry Bradshaw Society]. p. 384.
- Lanigan, John (1829). The Irish Church (ed.). An Ecclesiastical History of Ireland, from the first introduction of Christianity among the Irish, to the beginning of the thirteenth century. Vol. III (second ed.). Dublin: J. Cumming, 16, L. Ormond-Quay; London: Simpkin and Marshall; Edinburgh: R. Cadell and Co. pp. 30–32.
- Moran, James M. (2010). "Athleague, a panoramic snapshot" (1 January 2010 ed.). Roscommon People.
