= St. Peter's Church, Ennisnag, Kilkenny =

Saint Peters Church, Ennisnag
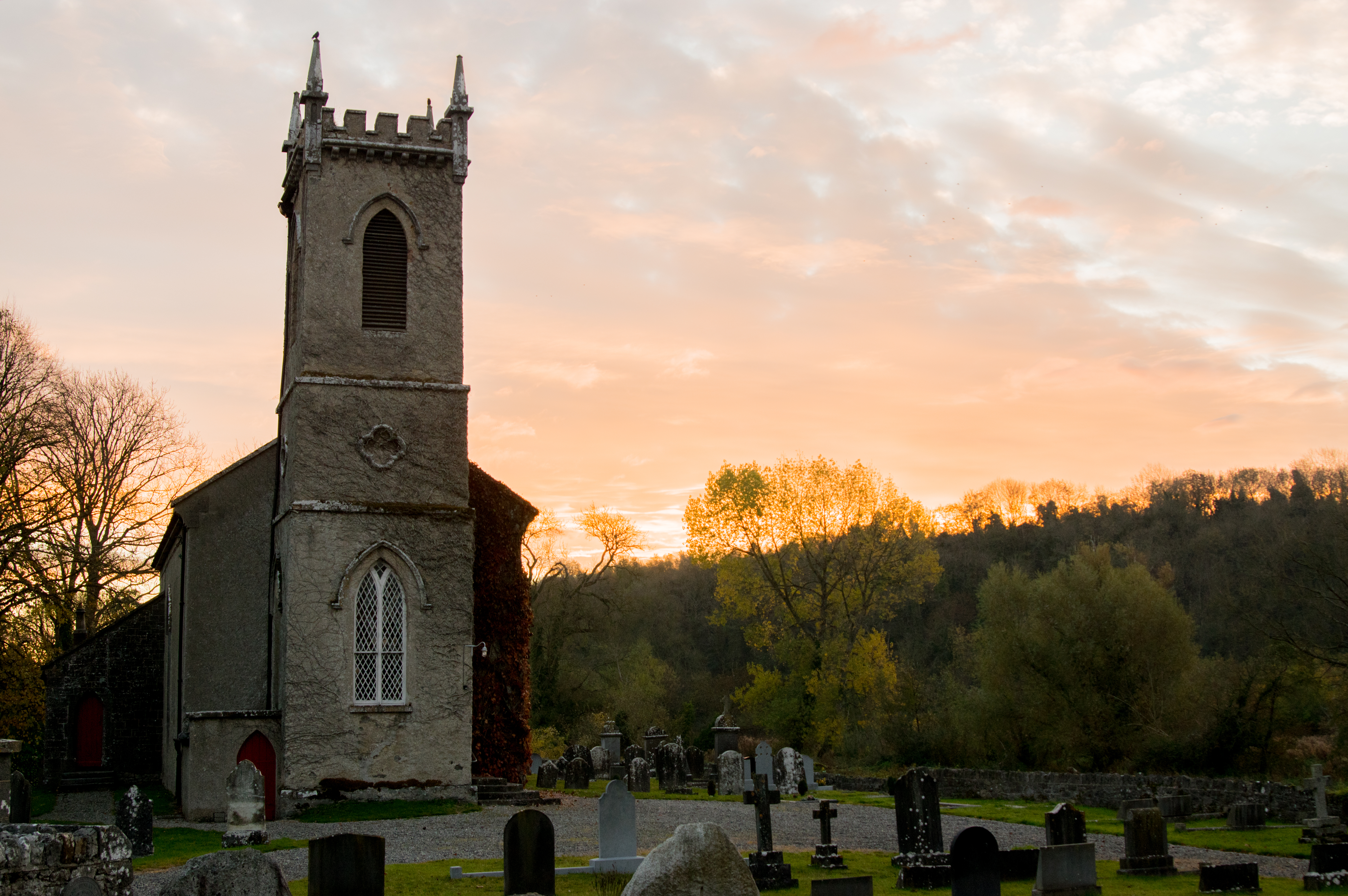
- St. Peter's Church Ennisnag at sunrise in 2018

- Location within Ireland
- 52°32′42″N 7°13′37″W
- Location: Ennisnag, County Kilkenny
- Country: Ireland
- Denomination: Church of Ireland
- Previous denomination: Roman Catholic
- Website: kellsgroupofparishes.wordpress.com

History
- Dedication: Manchán of Mohill

Architecture
- Completed: 1815

Administration
- Province: Province of Dublin
- Diocese: Diocese of Cashel and Ossory
- Parish: Kells with St Mary

Clergy
- Archbishop: Michael Jackson
- Bishop: Bishop of Cashel and Ossory

Saint Peter's Church, Ennisnag (Middle English: Inisnag and Irish: Inis Snaig meaning "the Island or Islet of the Crane or Heron") is a church of the United Dioceses of Cashel and Ossory and the ecclesiastical province of the United Provinces of Dublin and Cashel in the (Anglican) Church of Ireland. The church lies beside the Kings River, one mile north of Stoneyford village in County Kilkenny, Ireland. Located in the townland of Ennisnag, in the barony of Shillelogher.

The 19th century church was constructed on an old medieval monastery and church no longer extant. Probably the most distinguished rector and resident of Ennisnag was the famous Irish antiquarian, James Graves, who died in 1886. In the graveyard, Catholic burials to the rear and the Church of Ireland burials to the front. Among those buried there is Hubert Butler, the Anglo-Irish essayist.

== History ==
The Monastery of Ennisnag was an early Irish Christian monastery, and later a medieval prebendal church, located at Ennisnag, in County Kilkenny, Ireland. Little is known about the monastic community here. Canon William Carrigan suggested "an ancient Church stood on the site from time immemorial to after the Cromwellian era". John O'Hanlon reported that Diocese of Ossory ecclesiastical records names Saint Manchan as patron saint writing "at Inisnag, diocese of Ossory, St. Manchan, whose feast occurs on the 14th of February, was venerated as a patron (Statuta Dioecesis Ossoriensis)". So it was probably founded by Manchán of Mohill in the 5th or 6th century. (Note: One source claims "The patron saint of Ennisnag was St Mogue-Moling,"Mo'Aod Og" .. his feast day was celebrated here on the 14h of February", but Máedócs feast day is 29 January. Manchan, patron of Inisnag, feast day is 14 February.) The monastery of Inis-Snaig was probably small in scale. The church of Inisnag was recorded as prebendal of Ossory diocese, in the Taxatio Ecclesiastica of AD 1291–1292, and was granted on "the authority of Pope Nicholas IV, 1291 [liber ruber Ossoriensis]". The medieval church fell into ruins after the Dissolution of the Monasteries, and upheavals of 17th century Ireland. The medieval monastery and church are no longer extant. From the ruins, St Peter's church, of Protestant denomination, was established in the early 19th century.

== Architecture ==
Saint Peter's Church is a protected structure. The Board of First Fruits Church of Ireland built the church 1815 under the architect William Robertson. The church contains a detached three-bay double-height over part-basement single-cell.

== See also ==
- Religion in Ireland
- Protestantism in Ireland
