= Manchán of Mohill =

5th and 6th-century Irish monk and saint

Saint Manchan
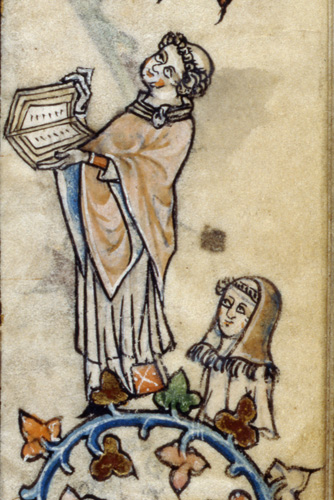
- Detail of marginal image of a monk

Missionary, Monk
- Born: Before AD 464; Ireland or Wales
- Died: c. 535 – c. 538 probably Mohill, Ireland
- Venerated in: Roman Catholic Church; Anglican Communion
- Major shrine: "Shrine of Manchan"
- Feast: 14 February
- Patronage: St. Manchan's school, Monaghan day, Mohill, County Leitrim; Monastery of Mohill * monastery of Inisnag * other churches * invoked against plague (* destroyed, or ruins)

Manchan (Note: Manchan name variants are: Irish: Manchán, Mancháin, Manchein, Mainchéin, Middle English: Manachain, Mainchin, Manachain, Managhan, Monahan, Latin: Manchianus, Mancenus, Manichchaeus, Monahan, Welsh: Maucannus, Maucann, Mancan, Mancen, Maucan or Moucan.) of Mohill, (Note: Mohill name variants historically includes Irish: Maothail, Maethail, Middle English: Moithla, Moethla, Maethla, Moyghell, Moghill, and Latin: Mathail, Nouella.) (fl. AD 464–538), was an early Christian saint credited with founding many early Christian churches in Ireland. His life is obscured because many people named Manchan are found among Irish Christians. Manchan probably died of famine during volcanic winters caused by the extreme weather events of 535–536.

The Shrine of Manchan is an example of Irish Urnes style art. Manchan's feast day is celebrated on 14 February.

== Life ==
The life of Manchan of Mohill is clouded by obscurity, his genealogy widely debated. (Note: Plausible but objectionable pedigrees are assigned to Manchan of Mohill by both Cronnelly and O'Clery- "Manchan mac Siollan mac Conal mac Luchain mac Conal Anglonaig mac Feice mac Rosa mac Fachta mac Seanchada mac Aille Ceasdaig mac Rory (King of Ireland)". Giraudon (2010) says "for some, he would be the son of Daga, for the others, of Innaoi. His mother's name was Mella and he had two sisters, Grealla and Greillseach". The oldest genealogy from the Book of Leinster is ambiguous- "Manchan Léith m Sillain m Conaill m Luachain m Laga m Conaill Anglonnaig m Fheic m Rosa. Mella mater eius". Léith refers to 'Leigh in Tipperary' or 'Lemanaghan in Offaly' both probable Manchan church-sites.) The multiplicity of Saints named Manchan suggests the name is a diminutive of Irish: Manach (Latin: Monachus, Im manchaine (Note: "Im manchaine: Under monastic rule "Im manchaine"; lit. 'in monkship'. Manchaine (deriv. from manach: monachus) also means the duties or services rendered by monks.")) a monk. Some sources identify him as Manchan of Mondrehid, a claim challenged, but many others identify him with Manchan of Lemanaghan (died A.D. 664). (Note: An alleged multiplicity of "Manchán's of Lemanaghan" confuses matters. Colgan (1647) claimed two Manchán of Lemanaghan lived in the 7th century, one dying c. 664 and the other flourishing 694, but Monahan and O'Donovan disputed the claim.) An exiled "Manchan the Master" at the monastery of Mawgan (Note: The similarity of "Welsh: Maucan" to "Maucen (of Whithern)" has been used to argue Candida Casa was in Wales, not Scotland. Patrick Moran and William Skene claim a Manchan (Mancenus, Manchenius, "the Master") studied at Candida Casa, but other sources say Manchan was the surname of "Nennio" or "Monen" (flourished 520), Bishop and "Master" of Candida Casa.) named in the "life of David of Wales" flourished before Manchan of Mohill. John Colgan decided "that for want of authentic documents to prove the contrary, he must consider them as different persons" as feasts and chronologies disagree.

On the authority of Colgan, and the scribes of Iona Abbey who recorded his death as 538 AD in the Annals of Tigernach, Manchán of Mohill must be considered a distinct "Manchan", born in Ireland or Wales and flourishing c. 464 – c. 538. He belonged to the "first order of Patrician clergy", active missionary priests accompanying or following Saint Patrick, typically Britons or Irish ordained by him and his successors. (Note: Colgan conjectured Manchan of Mohill was contemporary with a Saint Menath (Monach? Mancen?) a disciple of St. Patrick.) Chronologies of the earliest Irish christian tradition have Manchan allied to Saint Senan (died 544), (Note: According to "The Miracles of Senan" poem, Saint Manchan and Saint Berchan were duty-bound to come avenge any wrong done to Senan's churches. The Miracles of Senan poem says- "Eralt comes thither with (good) augury, and a host of the saints of Luigne, Manchan comes by dear God's will, and Berchan with his companies".) contemporary with Saint Berchan and Saint Sinchell the elder (died 549), and a successor of Caillín at Fenagh.

Manchan of Mohill, uniquely among Mainchíns, founded many early Christian churches, alluded to by the Martyrology of Donegal as "Latin: Manchani Maethla, cum sociis suis" (meaning Manchán of Mohill and his companions), and the Martyrology of Gorman as "Latin: cum sociis" ("with allies").

When or where he commenced his religious course is unknown. However the translator of the Annals of Clonmacnoise disbelievingly recorded "the Coworbes of Saint Manchan [at Lemanaghan] say that he was a Welshman and came to this kingdom at one with Saint Patrick". (Note: The writer Thomas Cahill claimed Manchan of Offaly was a convert of Saint Patrick.) Persons of this name from Wales include Meugan (Maucan or Moucan) mentioned in the "11th-century life of Cadoc" of Llancarfan in Glamorganshire, and Mannacus of Holyhead whose feast day falls on 14 October.

The sanctity of Manchán of Mohill is recorded. The Mostyn Manuscript No. 88 in the National Library of Wales records several Meugan festivals including the 14 February festival of Manchan of Mohill. The "Martyrology of Donegal" records "Latin: c. sexto decimo kal. martii. 14. Mainchein, of Moethail", and the "Martyrology of Gorman" notes "Manchéin of Moethail, Feb. 14". The Irish Annals identify Manchan of Mohill, uniquely among all Mainchíns, as the Saint whose relics are venerated by the "Shrine of Manchan of Moethail", perhaps jointly.

the Coworbes of Saint Manchan say that he was a Welshman and came to this kingdom at one with Saint Patrick.

== Churches ==
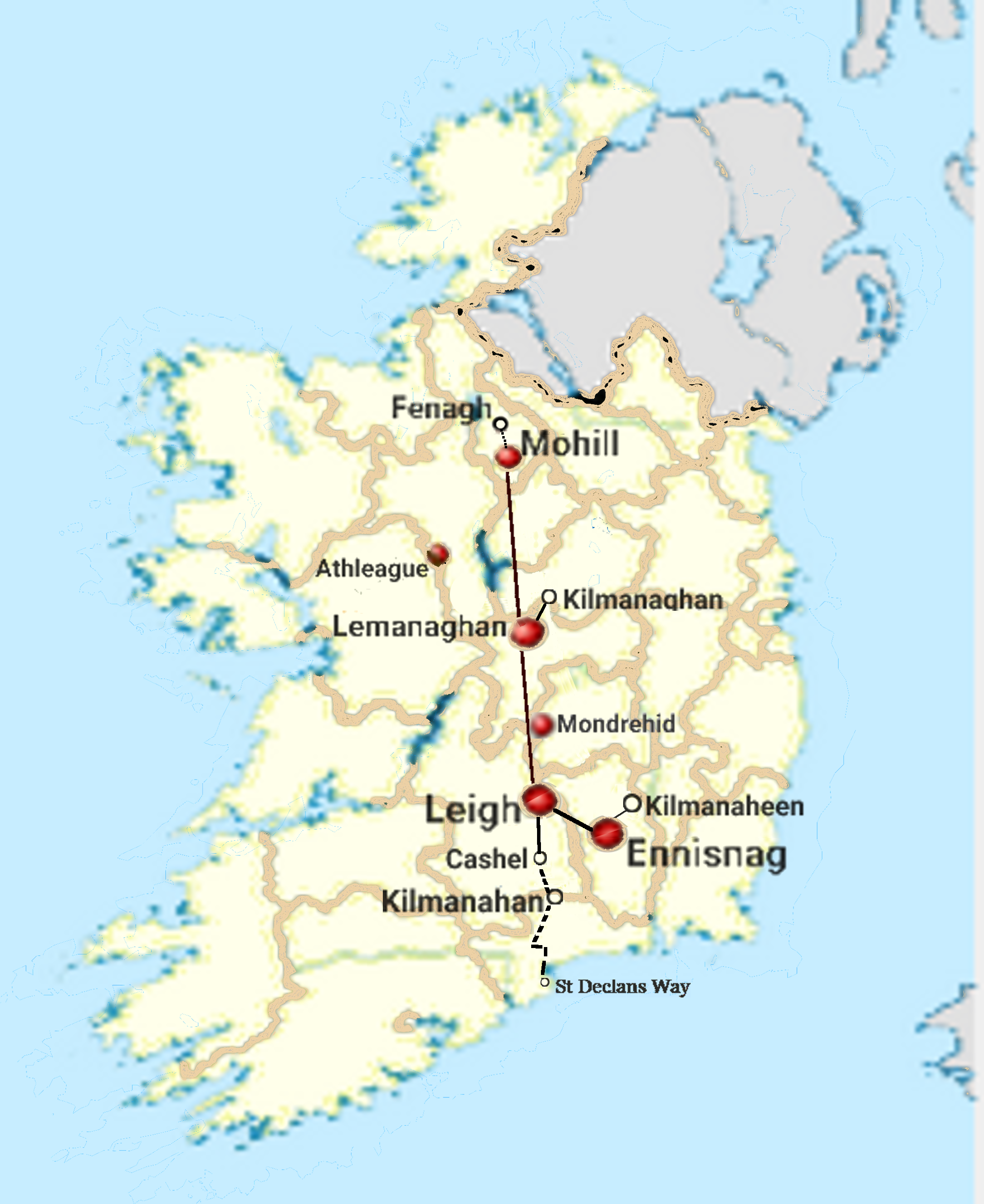
Well-defined Manchan route:- Mohill–Liathmore, County Tipperary–Inisnag–Wales? (Note: In ancient times people preferred long distance travel by sea and inland-waterways because overland "conditions were difficult, often dangerous, and long-distance travel by road was generally slow and uncomfortable". The key rivers serving the Manchan route were the River Shannon, the Rinn river in county Leitrim, the Munster River and Kings River serving Tipperary/Kilkenny, and the River Nore serving County Waterford and the south-east generally.)

Confirmed Manchan of Mohill church sites are –

- Mohill (Monastery of Maothail-Manachan) in county Leitrim, founded by Manchan in the 6th century.
- Ennisnag (Irish: Inish Snaig), County Kilkenny- Founded by Manchan in the 5th or 6th century. (Note: One source claims "The patron saint of Ennisnag was St Mogue-Moling,"Mo'Aod Og" .. his feast day was celebrated here on the 14h of February", but Máedócs feast day is 29 January. Manchan, patron of Inisnag, feast day is 14 February.)

Probable church sites of Manchan of Mohill would include-

- Kilmanaheen (Irish: Cill Mhainchín, "Manchan's church") in County Kilkenny, is 10km east of the Monastery of Inis-Snaig. (Note: Kilmanaheen in county Kilkenny must not be confused with "Kilmanach" (Irish: Manach Droichit) or "Kilnamanagh" in Kilkenny/ Tallaght.)
- Lemanaghan (Irish: Liath Mancháin, "Grey place of Manchan") in County Offaly- Persistent claims Manchan of Mohill moved to Lemanaghan in folklore, is made more plausible by dendrochronological dating suggesting a possibility of an earlier 5th or 6th century church here at Lemanaghan. O'Donovan, and others, believed Manchan of Mohill founded Lemanaghan church. (Note: John O'Donovan stated that "Manchan was an intimate friend of Caillín, the Executor of his Will and his successor in the Abbacy of Fenagh. He was the son of Innaoi and his Festival was celebrated at Liath-Manchain on 24 January". Giraudon says- "[from french] Saint Manchàn lived in the sixth or seventh century of our era. He was born in Mohill, County Leitrim. He spent most of his life in Leamanachan". O'Hanlon states- "a very strong inference might be drawn, that the St. Manchan of Mohill having so many churches subject to him was probably identical with the St. Manchan of Lemanagan; even, although, the places were somewhat apart, and although the festivals fell on different days.") (Note: "Tuaim nEirc" is interpreted as Lemanaghan but no evidence is presented for this identification. "Tuaim nEirc" could refer to "Irish: Baile Uí nEirc" townland adjacent to Léith Mhór in county Tipperary.)
- Kilmanaghan (Irish: Cill Mhancháin, "Manchan's church") in County Offaly is associated with "Manchan of Mohill/Lemanaghan" by folklore.
- Leighmore (Irish: Léith Mhóir, 'great grey place') in County Tipperary. The "Book of Fenagh" claims Manchan of Mohill went here, (Note: According to the Book of Fenagh an elderly Caillin (fl. AD464) wished to die at Liath Mhór (24 km from the town named Callan) with Manchan returning his remains to Fenagh 12 years after his death. This text connects Manchan of Mohill with Liath-Mhoir in Tipperary long before Saint Mochaemhog of Leithmor (d. 646).) and the "Irish Litanies" names a "Manchan Leithmor". (Note: The 'Irish Litanies', described by Mícheál Ó Cléirigh as "an authoritative old ancient vellum book", includes a poem stanza stating- "the twelve Conchennaighi with the two Sinchells in Cill Achidh [I invoke], The Conchennaighi with Manchan of Leithmor, [I invoke]",. "Conchennaighi", meaning "dog/hound headed", could reference the Conmhaicne (Conmac, son of the hound). Conversely "Manchan of Mohill" and "Sinchell the Elder" are supposedly connected with "Conmhaicne Rein" of Leitrim, though Ó Concheanainn were supposedly a minor tribe of Corca Mogha around Kilkerrin in NE Galway. However, the meaning of the word 'Conchennaighi' is unclear.)
- Kilmanahan (Irish: Cill Mainchín, "Manchan's church") in County Waterford, lies 40km south-west of Inisnag in Kilkenny, and Liath Mhóir in Tipperary.

The twelve Conchennaighi with the two Sinchells in Cill Achidh, The Conchennaighi with Manchan of Leithmor, [I invoke],

Conjectural church locations of Manchan of Mohill might include-

- Mondrehid (Irish: Mion Droichid) in Laois- O'Hanlon, Ware, and Ussher claim Manchan of Mohill founded the church.
- Wales- The "Coarbs of Lemanaghan" claimed Manchan was Welshman who arrived with Saint Patrick.

== Famine and death ==
The Irish Annals record a cluster of deaths for person(s) named Mochta (died 534 or 535), Mocta/Mauchteus (d. 537), and Manchán (d. 538). These entries could correlate to the one person, (Note: The Annals of the Four Masters states- "A.D. 534, Saint Mochta, Bishop of Lughmhagh, disciple of St. Patrick, resigned his spirit to heaven on the nineteenth day of August." The Annals of Ulster state- "A.D. 535, The falling alseep of Mochta, disciple of Saint Patrick, on the 13th of the Kalends of September. Thus he himself wrote in his epistle: Mauchteus, a sinner, priest, disciple of St Patrick, sends greetings in the Lord' .....A.D. 537, Or here, the falling asleep of St Mochta, disciple of Patrick".) but one entry is unequivocal- "AD 538: Manchán of Maethail fell (Irish: Manchan Maethla cecídit)". Manchán probably died as a result of famines caused by the extreme weather events of 535-536. The Irish Annals cite the weather events, and resulting famine, as "the failure of bread" giving the years 536AD, 538AD, and 539AD.

== Christian veneration of Manchán ==
The remains of Manchan were probably preserved for a long time in the Monastery of Maothail-Manachan before being enshrined.

=== Protection from plague ===
Manchán was perhaps venerated for protection from plague considering his 538 death during worldwide famine, and preceded a deadly plague at Mohill. (Note: From the mid-6th century, prayers to Saint Manchan would beg salvation from the horrors of plague and natural disaster. Ann Dooley noted "prayers of saints are a powerful factor in protecting their clients from harms such as the plague, and showing the ability of Irish tradition of sainthood to pick up on the social responsibilities for children left without any legal standing in a stricken community where normal family law has broken down".)

=== Kilkenny ===
In County Kilkenny, Manchan of Mohill is recorded as patron saint of the ancient monastery at Ennisnag. Nearby, Kilmanaheen townland preserves his name.

=== Leitrim ===
In county Leitrim, Manchán is venerated as patron saint of Mohill-Manchan parish since the foundation of the Monastery of Maothail-Manachan and the Justinian plague of Mohill. John O'Donovan visiting 19th century Mohill, claimed "Monahan's (or St. Manchan's) Well is still shown there", though the location of his holy well is forgotten. From 1935 to 2015 the GAA football park in Mohill, which officially opened on 8 May 1939, was called after him. Mohill GAA teams preserve his name. St Manchan's Primary School in Mohill, costing €2.5m was opened in 2010.

==== Manchán's fair (Monaghan day) ====
Until the late 20th century, the renowned Monaghan day festival of Manchán, was held in Mohill each year on the feast day of the Saint, or rather on the "Twenty fifth of February". The date of the ancient fair of Manchán moved to February 25 in the New Calendar from 14 February in the Old Calendar, c. 1753. The plot of the acclaimed novel by John McGahern, titled "Amongst Women", revolves around "Monaghan day" in Mohill, county Leitrim. The fair day was also infamous as the backdrop for organized faction fights in the 19th century.

=== Shrine of Manchán ===
In the 12th century, "Ruaidrí Ua Conchobair commenced his reign by creating shrines for the relics of St. Manchan of Moethail" and Saint Comman of Roscommon. The Annals of the Four Masters states "AD 1166: The shrine of Manchan, of Maethail was covered by Ruaidrí Ua Conchobair, and an embroidering of gold was carried over it by him, in as good a style as a relic was ever covered in Ireland". (Note: And the Annals of the Four Masters states "AD 1170: The relics of Comman, son of Faelchu, were removed from the earth by Gilla-Iarlaithe Ua Carmacain, successor of Comman, and they were enclosed in a shrine with a covering of gold and silver.) His shrine (Irish: Scrin-Manchain Maothla) could be a lost relic, but is likely identical to the Shrine associated with Manchán of Lemanaghan despite Manchán of Maethail being named as the saint being venerated.

The shrine of Manchan is an impressive box of yew wood with gilted bronze and enamel fittings, a house-shaped shrine in the form of a gabled roof, originally covered with silver plates of which traces still remain. It stands 19 inches tall, covering a space dimensioned 24x16 inches, raised by short legs and clearing the ground surface by two and a half inches. The legs slot into metal shoes, attached to metal rings probably to be attached to carrying-poles when the shrine was leading a procession. Animal patterns of beasts and serpent fill the bosses and borders of the shrine, and one side has a decorative equal-armed cross with bosses. The animal ornament on the principal faces of the relic reveals influences of Irish Urnes style adapted to Ringerike style. The reincarnation of centuries-old Irish metalworking techniques, such as the juxtaposition of red and yellow enamel, is seen on the shrine, and the Cross of Cong. Before the Vikings there were already varied ethnic types in Ireland, and a long disappearing "Mediterranean" stratum of architecture and costume identifiable as "Iberian" is evidenced by the Shrine of Manchan and the Book of Kells. Hewson, referring to theories of Charles Piazzi Smyth, observed the two upper compartments would have held two groups of six figurines and the two lower compartments held two groups of seven figurines, and the total represented a monthly cycle of 26 days divided into two cycles.

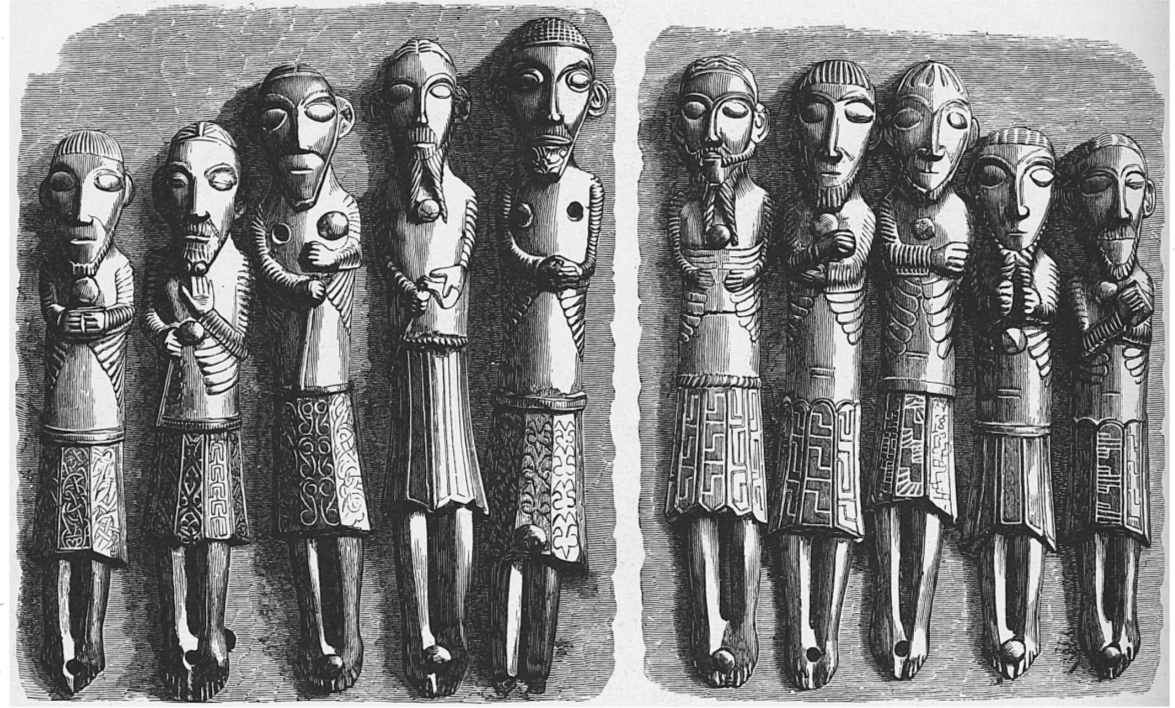
Shrine of Manchan, ten figures on front, incl. Olaf II of Norway, with axe

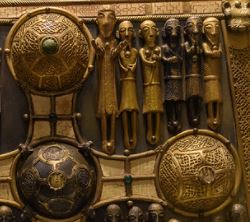
Detail of front

The ten figures adorning the shrine are newer, probably 13th century. It is believed the half-round cast-bronze figure carrying an axe on the Manchan Shine, is an early representation of Olaf II of Norway (Saint Olaf), considering the sub-Viking context of the art, and iconographical association of a man with axe. In 1861, an "appliqué" figure of gilt, cast copper-alloy, 13.7cm high, 2.75cm wide, and 1.7 cm thickness, was reportedly found at the grave-yard of Clonmacnoise, and presented with a short beard and moustache, a pointed decorated hat covering his ears, hands flat on his bare chest, with a pleated decorated kilt, one missing leg, and was very similar those remaining on the shrine of Manchan, so is assumed to have fallen off. Margaret Stokes claimed a robed figurine holding a book, found buried near Saint John's Abbey at Thomas Street, Dublin, bears resemblance to the Manchan shrine figures, but "of much finer workmanship and evidently earlier date", but unfortunately she fails to expand further.

The dress and personal adornment of lay and chieftain costume of 13th-century Irish people is reflected by the figures. The wearing of the "celt" (anglicized "kilt", pron. 'kelt'), similar to the present-day Scottish highland kilt, was very common in Ireland, and all figures on the shrine of Manchán have highly long ornamented, embroidered, or pleated, "kilts" reaching below their knees, as kilts were probably worn by both ecclesiastical and laypersons. The wearing of full beards (Irish: grenn, feasog) was only acceptable for the higher classes (nobles, chiefs, warriors), and it was disgraceful to present with hair and beard trimmed short. Reflecting this, all the shrine of Manchán figures have beards cut rectangularly, or Assyrian style, usually with no moustache.

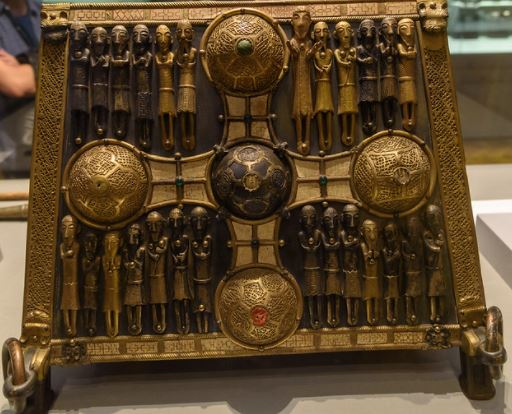
shrine of Saint Manchan, front

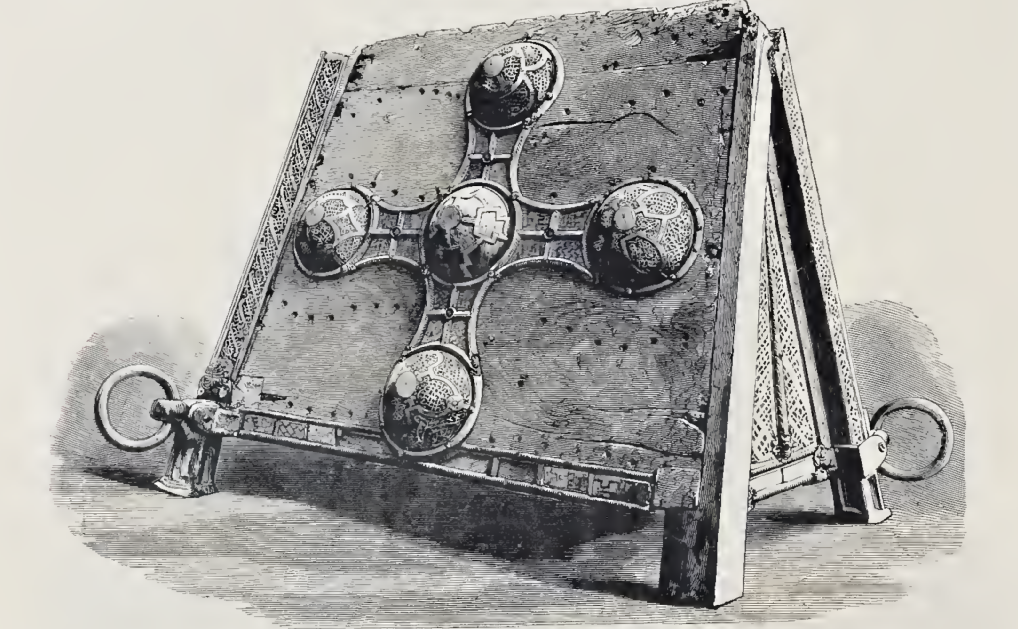
shrine of Saint Manchan, back

The technical and stylistic similarities to the "Cross of Cong group", (Note: The 'Cross of Cong', 'the Aghadoe crosier', 'shrine of the Book of Dimma' and the 'shrine of Manchan' are grouped as originating at the same Roscommon workshop. The "Smalls Sword", dating to c. 664, recently discovered in Wales and shows similar Urnes ornamentation.) confirms without doubt the shrine of Manchan was crafted at the "well-defined and original" fine-metal workshop active in twelfth century county Roscommon. The shrine was likely commissioned by Bishop "Domnall mac Flannacain Ui Dubthaig", of Elphin, one of the richest episcopal see's in Medieval Ireland, and created by the master gold-craftsman named Irish: Mael Isu Bratain Ui Echach ("Mailisa MacEgan"), whom John O'Donovan believed was Abbot of Cloncraff in county Roscommon, though firm evidence for this identification is lacking. The founder and patron saint of this workshop, might have been St. Assicus of Elphin. Ruaidrí Ua Conchobair was apparently patron of the relic, though it was monasteries rather than dioceses which commissioned metal reliquaries.

The pertinent question is the sacral function and spiritual identity underlying the shrine. Keane suggested the shrine represents a "miniature Ark", an object to be carried on "men's shoulders", an emblem of death to Noah, and those enclosed in the Ark, with their release, on delivery of the Ark, celebrated as Resurrection. Another thought-provoking theory proposes the shrine had a political context, representing an attempt by royal patrons to visually cementing political alliances through the purposeful conflation of two neighbouring saints, both conveniently named "Manchan". Murray (2013) believes, the argument these reliquaries are multivalent is compelling, when necessary evidence is presented.

- The shrine of Saint Manchan "is inventive", drawing on "a variety of traditions, including the archaic forms of the tomb-shrines to create a new and powerful statement of the saint's significance in the twelfth century".
- "The crucified figure in the sculptures from a Persian Rock Temple may assist in explaining the mummy-like figures on the Irish shrine. The similarity of the design would seem to confirm the idea that the figures were intended to signify the inmates of the Ark, undergoing the process of mysterious death, which was supposed to be exhibited in Arkite ceremonies".
- "There is a case for the equation of tent and shrine. "papilio", whence "pupall", is primarily the word for butterfly and came to mean tent from a physical resemblance, i.e. from the fact that the wings in two planes meet at an angle. The term .. Piramis (pyramis), literally "pyramid", and .. the presence of a bearer at each angle, is surely intended to suggest the Ark of the Covenant, a proto-reliquary; pyramis has more than one meaning or connotation .. I suggest that tent-shaped slab shrines were pyramides too".

There is doubt to which Irish saint the shrine is dedicated. Stokes wondered if the Annals of the Four Masters identified the wrong Mainchín. O'Hanlon and others felt a strong inference can be made that Manchan of Mohill and Manchán of Lemanaghan are identical.

Graves suggested the shrine was transferred from Mohill for some unrecorded reason. In support of this theory, the English were suppressing Monasteries in Ireland from 1540, and in 1590 Mohill was occupied by an "immense" English army. Confused folklore credits Mohill priests saving the shrine from iconoclasts by fleeing the Monastery of Mohill-Manchan to County Offaly-

- "In 1621 [sic], when St. Manchan's monastery was suppressed, some of the fugitive monks succeeded in bringing the shrine back to Le-Manchan".
- "When Mohill Abbey was destroyed in the twelfth century [sic], the holy Shrine would have been carried back to Leamonaghan".

The association with Clonmacnoise and Clonfert might also be strong as the smaller heads on the shrine (figurines dated 13th century) are considered similar to those "on the underside of the abaci of the chancel arch at the Nun's church, Clonmacnoise, and the portal at clonfert". Before 1590 the Shrine of Manchan was hidden somewhere in Ireland, and Mícheál Ó Cléirigh writing in 1630 recorded the shrine at Lemanaghan, then situated in an impassable bog. Today the shrine is preserved at Boher Catholic church in County Offaly.

when St. Manchan's monastery was suppressed, some of the fugitive monks succeeded in bringing the shrine back to Le-Manchan".

=== Lost biography of Manchan ===
James Ussher claimed to have "Vita Manchan Mathail" (Life of St. Manchan of Mohill) written by Richard FitzRalph showing Manchan fl.c. 608, a member of Canons Regular of Augustinian, patron of seven churches, and granted various glebes, lands, fiefs, and tithe to the Monastery of Mohill-Manchan since 608. However, there was no such thing as Canons Regular order of Augustinian, glebes, tithes back in the 5th–7th centuries, so these contemporary concepts would not illuminate the life of any Saint Manchan. John O'Donovan, James Henthorn Todd, and others, tried unsuccessfully to locate this book. Ussher's claims strongly influenced antiquarian speculation of his life story. (Note: Manchanus, founder of the monastery of regular canons at Mohil in the county of Leitrim, died in the year 652. His life is supposed to have been written by Richard, Archbishop of Armagh. The Ulster annals call him Manchenus; and others Manichaeus: Whereupon it is observed that the heretic Manichees and Menahem, (2 Kings xv. 14.) King of Israel have their names from the same original word, signifying The Comforter. Nazarenus begs of his Megaletor, to enquire among his learned acquaintance of the Irish college at Louvain, who is Manchanus, a writer who shines much in the margin of his famous four gospels; concerning whom, says he, though there be many of this name, I have my own conjectures. Having just learned what this fanciful writer thought of Marianus, Columbanus &c. I imagined that he was of opinion that Manchanus must have been a fervent or lover of the isle of Man: But his learned friend, and mine, Mr. Wanley, lately informed me, that he only guessed that Manchanus was a corruption of Monanchanus and that the man whose praises are in his four gospels, was a canon regular of Monaghan. The reader will judge, whether Archbishop Usher's conjectures, or Mr. Toland's are the more probable".)

== See also ==
- Mainchín and Mawgan, for various Saint Manchans.
- Mannacus of Holyhead, Saint David, Cadoc, Saint Patrick, Saint Teilo, Cybi are Welsh contemporaries.
