= Saint Manchan's Shrine =

Irish reliquary of the 12th century

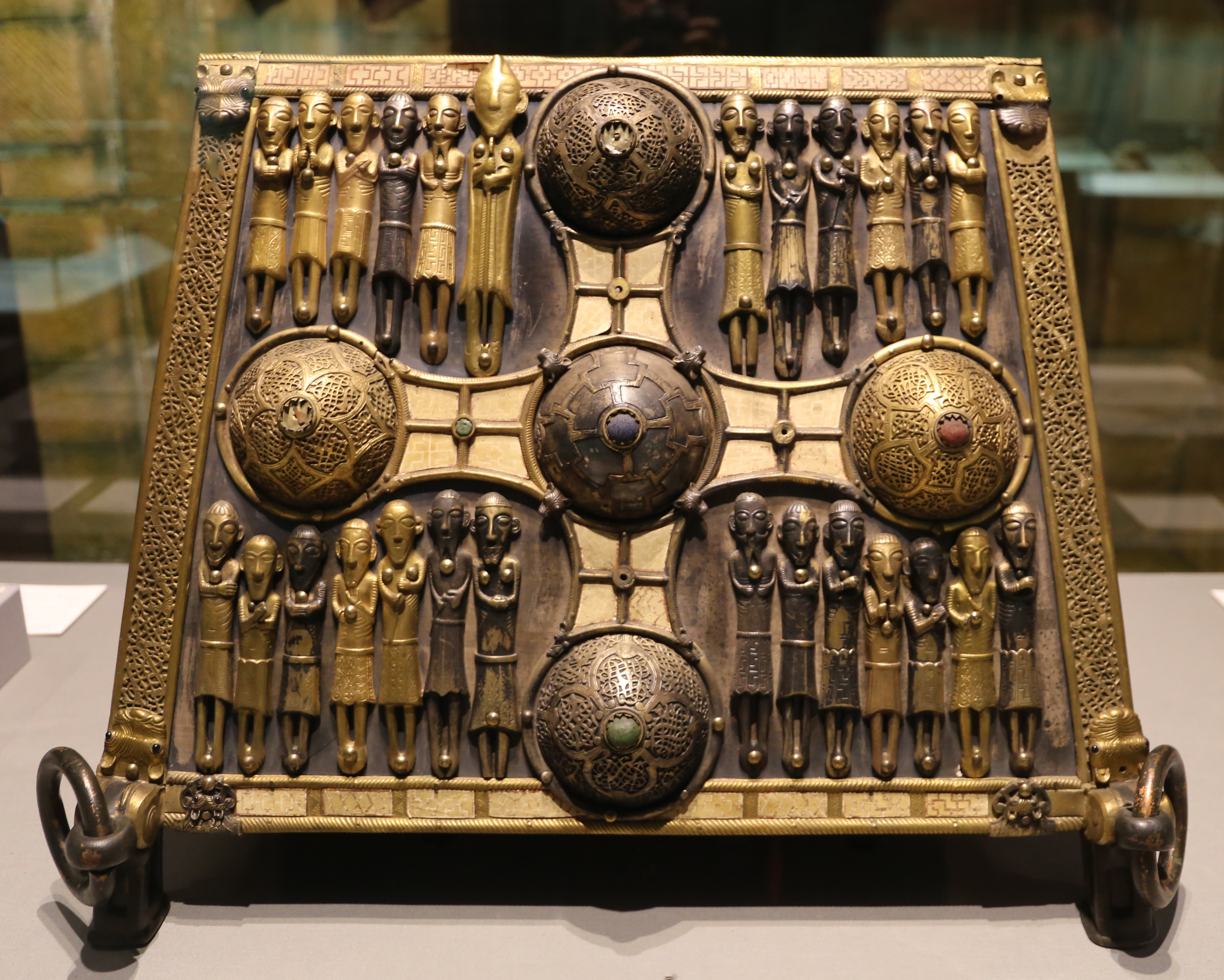
Front piece. Height 49 cm, width 60 cm, depth 36cm. Boher Roman Catholic Church, County Offaly

Saint Manchan's Shrine is a large (60-cm wide) 12th-century Irish house-shaped shrine dedicated to Manchán of Lemanaghan (died 664), now in Boher Roman Catholic Church, outside Ballycumber, County Offaly. Built to hold human remains, still intact and presumably of Manchán himself, the relic container consists of a wooden core made of yew, placed on four cast bronze feet, overlain by silver plates containing gilt, cast copper alloy and bronze decorations, with large bosses.

The shrine has a long history and has survived a number of sackings and fires. It was in poor condition when discovered in the collection of the Mooney family of Doon, County Offaly in 1821, with many of the figures and bosses missing; some of the current elements were added during late 19th century restorations.

Its style is a mixture of Irish and Viking art, and is described by the art historian Rachel Moss as "exceptional in its scale, form and quality of workmanship."

== Description ==
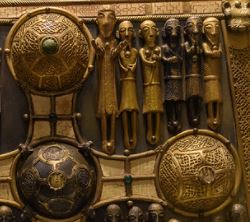
Detail of the front face

The outer plates are characterised by a high-pitched church roof-shape with triangular ends and an inward slope. Its two long faces are dominated by a central cross with circular bosses in the centre and at the end of each arm. The bosses are linked by flat mounts decorated with pale yellow and red enamel cloisonné, and interlace depictions of zoomorphic animals. The borders of both faces are lined with enamels and interlace, as are the sides.

Indicating its function as a portable, working relic carried by clergy, the lower portions hold large rings which were presumably placed so as to enable it to be carried on straps, presumably, given its size, by two people holding it on poles attached by robes shredded through rings. Art historian Griffin Murray describes how it would have been held much like a gurney or stretcher.

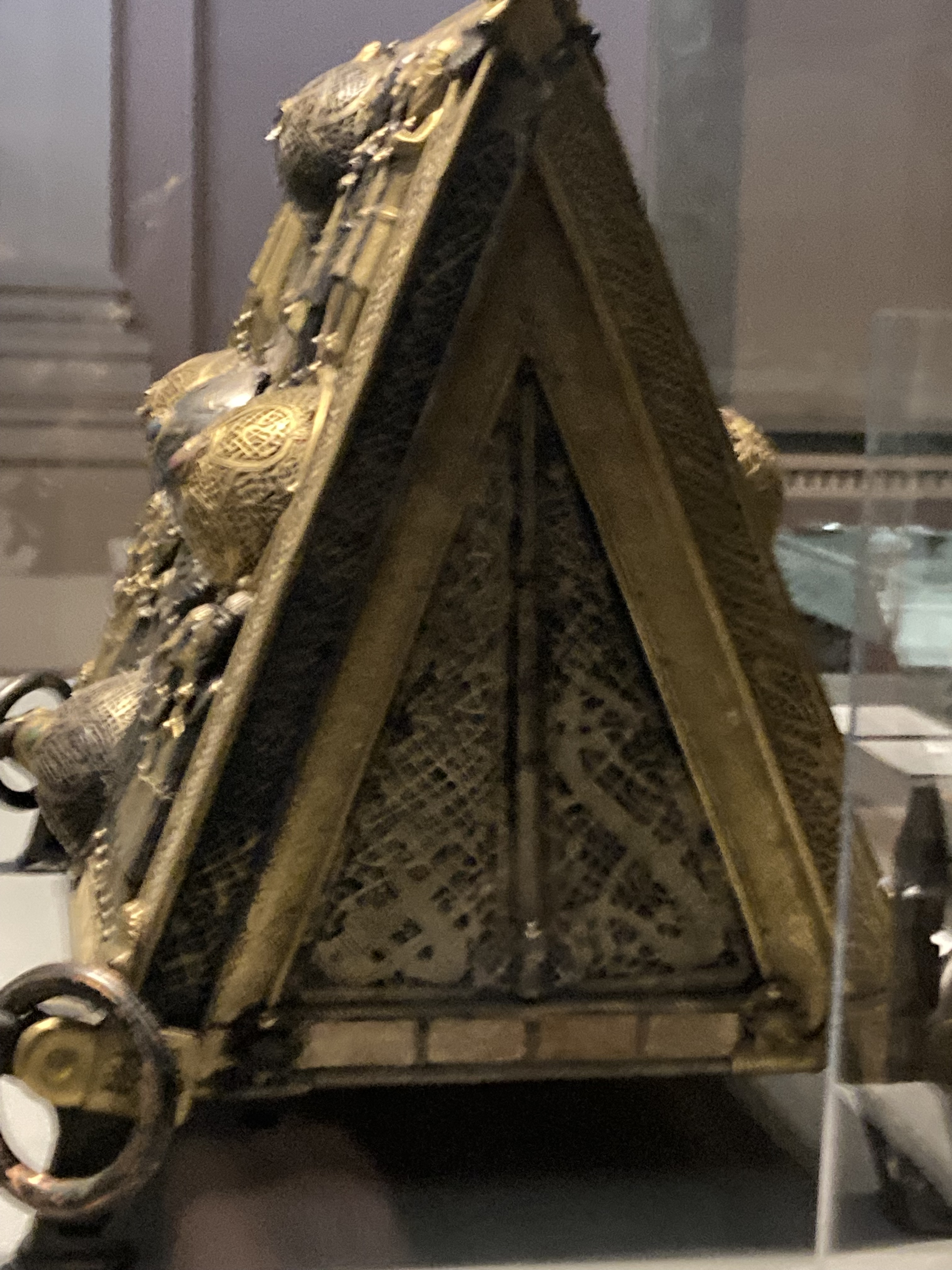
Side view

The crosses divide each arm into four separate sections; those above and below cross-arms contain four rows of figures in high relief, numbering 52 in total. They are formed from gilt bronze and are individually attached to the plates by nails. All of the figures are thin, male, and dressed in kilts. The figures all have similar faces but are individualised in other ways: some wear beards, some clasp their hands while others fold their arms, some carry axes, and one holds a book. The figures likely date from the late 12th century, that is after the majority of the shrine was built.

Its 12th-century dating is in part based on the fact that it bears a number of stylistic similarities to the c. 1123 Cross of Cong and may have been built by the same craftsman.

== Provenance ==
The shrine was probably produced in the River Shannon area, most likely at the monastery in Clonmacnoise, County Offaly, then a cell for Lemanaghan, parish of Manchan's church and residency. It is mentioned by the scribe Micheal O'Cleirigh in a 1631 inventory of Lemanaghan monastery. The site was destroyed in 1641, and the reliquary was taken to the castle at Kilcolgan County Galway, where it was described in 1646 as "enclosed in a leaden case." The shrine was shown at the 1872 Dublin Exhibition, where gathered significant interest and was photographed. Following this, James Graves wrote a lengthy monograph in 1875, entitled "The Church and Shrine of St. Manchan".

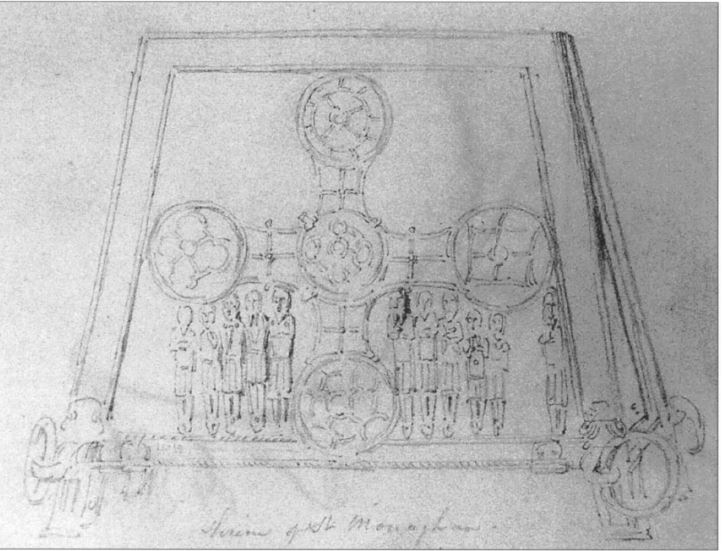
c.1821 sketch by George Petrie, made before the upper figures were reattached

The influential antiquarian, archaeologist and painter George Petrie was the first scholar to describe the shrine after finding it in the care of the Mooney family in 1821. It was then in poor condition; many of the figures were missing until they were replaced during later 19th c restorations. Petrie's 1821 sketches also show that at the time the, since replaced, animal-head nail on the viewer's right was missing. He notes that the people of Lemanaghan had given the shrine to the Mooney family "in modern times...for safe keeping." Previous to this, during the 18th century, it was kept in a thatched cottage at Esker, County Offaly, until the building was lost in a fire."

It was stolen from the church at Boher in 2012 but retrieved by local Garda Siochana soon after.

== Condition and study ==
The shrine was sent to the British Museum in 1935 for cleaning and refurbishing. It has been the subject of 21st-century scholarship, including lectures and descriptions by Rachel Moss of Trinity College Dublin, Griffin Murray of University College Cork, and in surveys of Viking art.

== Sources ==
- ARAS. "Shrine of St. Manchan: bronze; gilt; enamel; yew wood". Archive for Research in Archetypal Symbolism (ARAS)
- Corkery, Sean. "The Shrine of Saint Manchan". The Furrow, volume 12, no. 3, March 1961. JSTOR 27658066
- Crawford, Henry. "A Descriptive List of Irish Shrines and Reliquaries. Part I". The Journal of the Royal Society of Antiquaries of Ireland, 6th series, volume 13, no. 1, June 1923. JSTOR 25513282
- Lucas, Anthony. "The Social Role of Relics and Reliquaries in Ancient Ireland". The Journal of the Royal Society of Antiquaries of Ireland, volume 116, 1986. JSTOR 25508904
- Moss, Rachel. Medieval c. 400—c. 1600. "Art and Architecture of Ireland" series. London: Yale University Press, 2014. ISBN 978-0-3001-7919-4
- Murray, Griffin. "Lost and Found: The Eleventh Figure on St Manchan's Shrine". The Journal of the Royal Society of Antiquaries of Ireland, volume 133, 2003. JSTOR 25509113
- Ó Floinn, Raghnall. "A Fragmentary House-Shaped Shrine from Clonard, Co. Meath". Journal of Irish Archaeology, volume 5, 1990. JSTOR 30001620
- Youngs, Susan. "Reviewed Work: The Cross of Cong, A Masterpiece of Medieval Irish Art by Griffin Murray". Ulster Journal of Archaeology, third Series, volume 72, 2014. JSTOR 44135450
