= Monastery of Mohill-Manchan =

Historic monastery in Ireland

- Location within Ireland
- Interactive map of Monastery of Mohill-Manchan

Monastery information
- Other name: Saint Mary's Priory of Maethail-Manchan
- Established: 6th century
- Disestablished: c. 1550 – c. 1590
- Dedication: Saint Manchan
- Diocese: Diocese of Ardagh
- Controlled churches: Medieval Christian

People
- Founder: Saint Manchan

Site
- Location: County Leitrim
- Country: Ireland
- Coordinates: 53.92259°N 7.86557°W
- Visible remains: school-house ruins round tower base.
- Public access: No

The monastery of Mohill-Manchan (Irish: mainistir an Maothail-Manachain) was anciently located at Mohill, (Note: Mohill name variants historically include Irish: Maothail, Maethail, Middle English: Moithla, Moethla, Maethla, Moyghell, Moghill, and Latin: Mathail, Nouella.) in county Leitrim. The earliest church was founded by Manchán of Mohill in the 6th century. Little is known about the former monastic community here. About the year 1216, the monastery became a religious house of the Canons Regular of Saint Augustine dedicated to the Saint Mary until suppression c. 1550 – c. 1590. The Priory of Mohill was briefly revived during Confederate Ireland rule but suppressed again by Cromwellian forces c. 1649–1653. From the ruins St. Mary's Church, Mohill, of Protestant denomination, was established in the 18th century.

== Monastery ==
The former monastic settlement of Mohill was one of a multitude of monasteries that sprang up during 6th century Ireland. (Note: Mohill was near the ancient border of the Kingdom of Meath and it is believed monasteries were all situated, roughly speaking, on the borders between provinces- "Of the boundary of Meath with the provinces here, ... and the Shannon to Loch-Bó-dearg, from that to Maothail, thence to Athluain [sic]". Note that Athlone was not on the ancient border of the Kingdom of Meath, so "Athluain" presumably refers to "Ath-Cluain" or Cloone.) A Christian missionary named Manchan founded a church here between 500–38AD. Whether or not Manchan died at Mohill is unknown, though his remains may have been preserved and enshrined here.

Nothing is known of the monastic community at Mohill, but it surely consisted of a church, school, mill, house of hospitality, Christian burial ground, monastic cells, "house of tears", (Note: Connected to the ancient Irish monasteries, there was usually a penitential prison called Oeančeać, or "house of tears", where the penitent could voluntarily undergo penance.) and a round tower. The monastery was governed by the bishop, abbot, and a uniquely Irish "erenagh", power being exercised by one person, or perhaps combined in practical permutations. It was strongly bound to the túath of Muintir Eolais, allowing the Bishop little influence; the lifestyle followed asceticism.

The monastery of Mohill was of considerable extent stretching across the river to encompass the townlands of Mohill, Tullybradan, Lisdadanan, Coolabaun, Cappagh, Gortfadda, Drumcroy and Drumkilla, an estate of c. 300 – c. 600 acres. A daughter church at Cloonmorris was founded c. 500–700AD.

== Priory ==
From the 13th century (c. 1216) following a reform movement of the Irish church, the monastery became the Priory of Saint Mary's of Mohill-Manchan. The priory belonged in the diocese of Ardagh, with Canons regular adhering to the Rule of St. Augustine. (Note: The "Canons regular of St. Augustine" differs from the Order of Saint Augustine (OSA) of today, though one could say that they are "ecclesiastical first cousins".) The Priory of St. Mary's was headed by a prior, their office being valued at 20 "marks sterling" c. 1400 – c. 1401, or "10–20 marks sterling" in the 15th century. In 1418, the Priory of St. Mary's at Mohill was described as "conventual, with cure", and a dependency of the priory of Abbeyshrule in Ardagh diocese, (Note: The Priory of Abbeyshrule was once referenced as the "monastery of St. Peter, Dearg", in papal registers.) and sufficiently attractive for a canon from Clonmacnoise to enter its doors. In 1475, the Priory of St. Mary's Mohill was described as "conventual", "elective", "with cure", whose value did not exceed c. "12 marks", and "not depending on any other monastery or place", though a petition dated 1477 again alleged the dependency existed

=== Personalities ===
It is impossible to fully catalogue the succession of holders of abbots, priors, and canons at this ancient monastery. The information below is preserved.

* aft. = after	* bef. = before	* d. = died in office, or in-commendam

Dates	Name	Office held	Extracts from papal, and ecclesiastical sources
c. aft. 500 – c. 538	Manchán of Mohill	abbot, saint	
c. bef 1397 – c. bef. 1412	Murianus Mag Raghnaill	prior, canon	"18 Dec 1397: Murianus, Augustinian prior of Moalmacnichem". and "1412: Murianus Magranyll".
c. aft. 1397 – c. bef. 1400 (d.)	John O'Chany	prior, canon	"John Ochany".
c. aft. 1400 – c. bef. 1413 (d.)	Gilbert O'Moran	prior, canon	"13 Jan 1400, Gilbert Omora", "Gillibert Omoran, canon of the Augustinian priory of St. Mary, Macchail Manchan in the diocese of Ardagh, afterwards prior, of Mohill".
c. aft. 1413 – c. bef. 1418	Matthew O'Roddy *	canon	"1413, canon of the Augustinian priory of St. Mary, Mayhel (Mayhil on f. 47), in the diocese of Ardagh, at present without a prior",
c. 1418 – c. bef. 1433	Matthew O'Roddy	prior	"8th July 1418, to collate and assign to ... Matthew (Orodachon), canon of Clonmacnoise, who has studied canon and civil law for more than ten years, after he has taken the habit and made his profession as above, the priory of St. Mary, Mucgail, O.S.A., in the diocese of Ardagh, ... void by the death of Gillibert Omoran".
c. bef. 1433 – c. aft. 1433	Fergus Mac Ilroy	prior, canon	"1433, Latin: Dicta die (x. Junii) Fergallus Mackilruays [Mac Gillroy], principalis, obligavit se Camere super annata, prioratus monasterii Beate Marie de Mayhel ord. S. Aug. Ardakaden. dioc".
c. 1458–1459 – c. aft. 1459	Robertus Magranayle	canon	"1458–1459, Rectoria [vacans] certo modo".
c. bef. 1473 – c. bef. 1475	Eogan Mag Raghnaill	prior, canon	"1475: death of Odo Magranayll", and "Odo Magranayll (before which it had been reserved to the apostolic see) ... some allege ... Odo who, although he had detained it for several years, never had any right or title, at least canonical". (Note: Odo must be the "Eogan Mag Ragnaill" mentioned in the Annals of Connacht.)
c. aft. 1475 – c. bef. 1485	Maurice Mac Egan	prior, canon	"15 March 1477: Mandate to grant in commendam for life to Maurice Macandagan, prior of St. Mary's, Mathail, O.S.A., in the diocese of Ardagh the perpetual vicarage of Anachuduib", (Note: Anachuduib refers to Annaduff in county Leitrim.) and "1478: Die XV. eiusdem mensis (Aprilis) una bulla pro Mauricio Macaeidagan [Mac Egan] priore monasterii B. Marie de Ma[e]thaill [Mohill] ord. S. Aug., Ardakaden. dioc".
c. bef. 1477 – c. 1486 (d.)	Cormac Mag Raghnaill (Note: The chronologies suggest Cormac and Farrell are identical..)	canon	"1477: Cormac Macraynaill, ... canons of Ardagh", and "1481: Cornelius Magranell, canonicus ecclesie Ardakaden.,.. pro annata monasterii B. M. de Granardo ord. Cist. Ardakaden. dioc, cuius fructus duodecim marchar. sterlingor ....".
c. bef. 1486 – c. 1486 (d.)	Farrell Mag Raghnaill	prior, canon	"1486: Farrell Mag Raghnaill ... died".
c. 1488	Eugene Mag Raghnaill	canon	"1488: ...[Cal. papal letters, 1484–92, pp 12 (no. 17); 119 (no 830.]".
c. 1485 – c. aft. 1526	Donald Mag Raghnaill	prior, canon	"1485: Cornelius O'Farrell ... nomine dni. Donati Magranayll, clerici Ardahaden [sic] dioc, pro annata prioratus monasterii Beate Marie de Maythayl [Mohill] ord. S. Aug. Ardakaden. dioc, ... vacantis alias per privationem Mauritii Machaigayn [Mac Egan]", "12 April 1508: Maurus and Donald Magranayl, canons of Ardagh", and in 1526 presiding at a metropolitan court in Termonfeckin: "Master Donald McGranyll of Ardagh".
bef. 1508	Rory Mag Raghnaill	canon (sacristship and sacerdotia)	1508: ...[5 Cal. papal letters, 1503–13, pp 24–25".
c. bef. 1489 – c. aft. 1508	Maurus Mag Raghnaill (Note: We have Thady Reynolds supposedly from Leitrim (barony) not Mohill (barony) ("1528: Master Tadeus McGranyll, sitting in the name of the primate" at Ternmonfeckin metropolitan court,) was consecrated Bishop of Kildare in 1641. Otherwise in 1556, there is a record of Dermot [Reynolds] son of the (unnamed) Prior of Mohill.)	canon	"Die dicta 26 Martii, 1489, dictus Maurus Magranayll, canonicus monasterii B. Marie de Maythayl [Mohill] ord. S. Aug., Ardakaden. dioc, principaUs, obligavit se Camere Apostolice pro annata rectorie par. eoclesiarum loci de Monterolays [Muintir-Eolais] dicte dioc, cuius fructus". Also, "1506–1507: The executors of Ofrigail's Bull (f. 140) were ... Manus Magraynyl [Magrannel alias Reynolds] canons of Ardagh.", and "12 April 1508: Maurus and Donald Magranayl, canons of Ardagh".
c. bef. 1541 – c. aft. 1541	Donald (and Terenacius) Mag Raghnaill	canons	"May 29, 1540. Primate to the Prior of St. Mary of Moyalt, diocese of Ardagh ... [who is prior?] ... May 1541 - Commission of the Primate to Donald and Terenacius Magranyll, canons of Ardagh, to confer the vicarage of the church of St. Fregus of Clone on Bernard Magranyl ... July 1541 - Primate commissions Donald Magranyll ...".
c. aft. 1552 – c. bef. 1590	?	prior, canon	Suppressed between 1550–1590.
21 Aug 1648 – c. 1652	Anthony Reynolds	prior, canon	"1648: Ardachadensis. Prioratus de Moyile ordinis canonicorum S. Augustini pro Antonio Reynald, presbytero dictae diocesis; fructis c. librarum".
c. 1653	-	-	Destroyed by Cromwellian forces. Monastic ruins dismantled by Croftons.

=== Annals ===
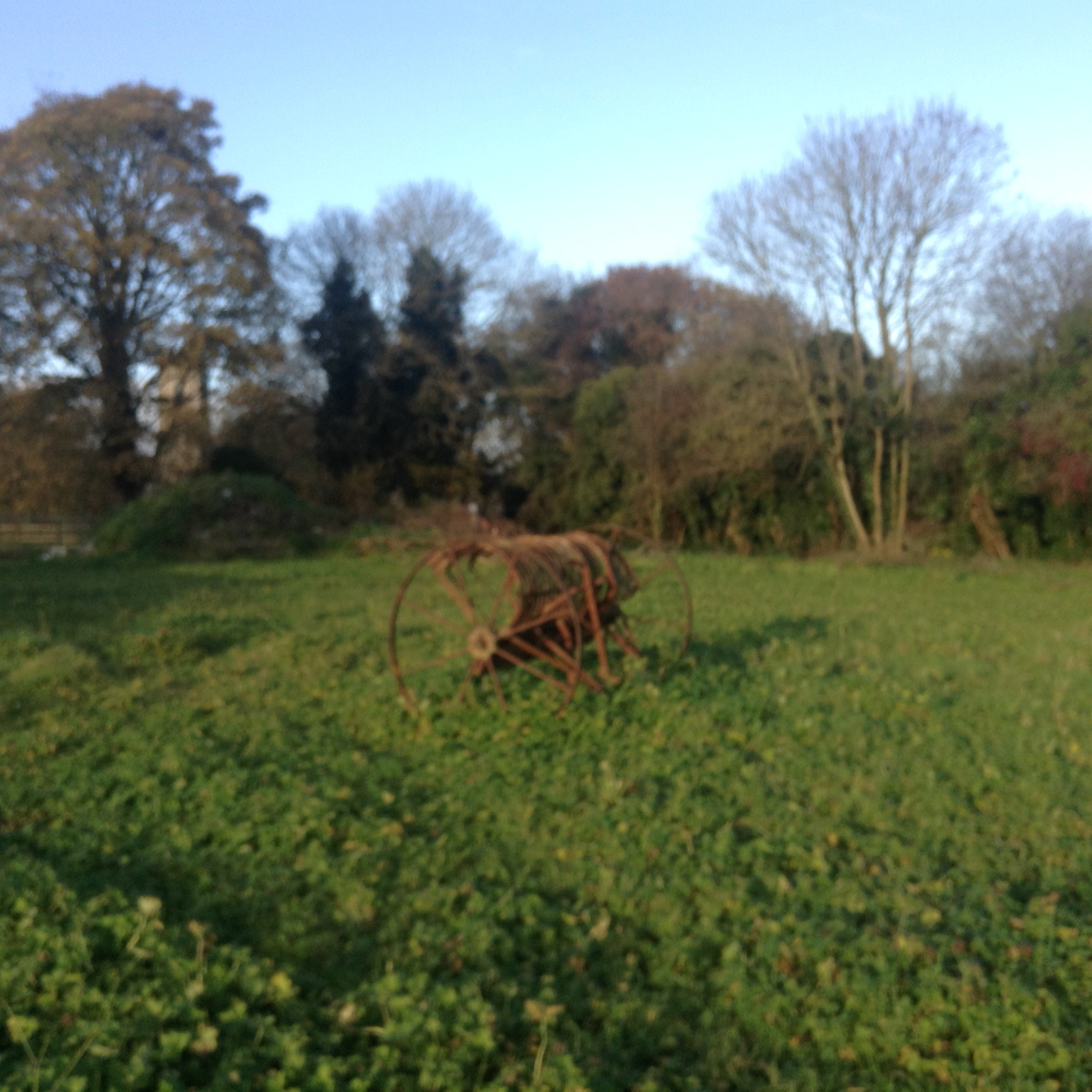
Monastery of Mohill-Manachan, former grounds

The Irish Annals refer to the priory of Mohill many times. For 1430AD the Annals of the Four Masters highlights an interesting privilege was the right of Mohill Priory to offer sanctuary to a fugitive fleeing from enemies. The Annals also records a military invasion of Muintir Eolais in March 1590, when the local Túaths were defeated and Mohill Priory was forfeited to the English crown.

- "AD 538: Manchán of Maethail fell".
- "1166: The shrine of Manchan, of Maethail, was covered by Ruaidhri Ua Conchobhair, and an embroidering of gold was carried over it by him, in as good a style as a relic was ever covered in Ireland".
- "1330: The coarb of (St) Caillin, Gilla-na-naev Mac Celie, died in the monastery of Maothail".
- "1430: Brian, the son of Tiernan Og O'Rourke, was slain by the sons of Melaghlin Mac Rannall, at Maethail-Mhanchain; and Donough Mac Tiernan was driven into the monastery of Maethail. Donough, however, came out of his own accord, for the sake of his people, on Mac Rannall's guarantee; and made peace between them; and an eric (compensation) was given to O'Rourke for the death of Brian".
- "1473: The son of Eogan Mag Ragnaill, prior of Mohill, rested.",
- "1486, The Prior of Maethail, Farrell, the son of Robert Mac Rannall, died".
- "1486: The prior of Maethal, namely, Ferghal, son of Raghnall, son of Robert, son of the Prior Mag Raghnaill, died this year on Easter Day".
- "1486: The Prior of Maethail, Farrell, the son of Robert Mac Rannall, died".
- "1590: An immense army was sent by the governor ... to Muinter-Eolais, in the beginning of March; and they captured ten hundred cows. And they were that night in Maethail; ... Pledges from the comarb of Fidhnacha, and pledges from the comarb of Druim-Oiriallaigh, and nine pledges from Muinter-Eolais, both church and territory, came with the Saxons on that occasion."

== First suppression, 1560-90 ==
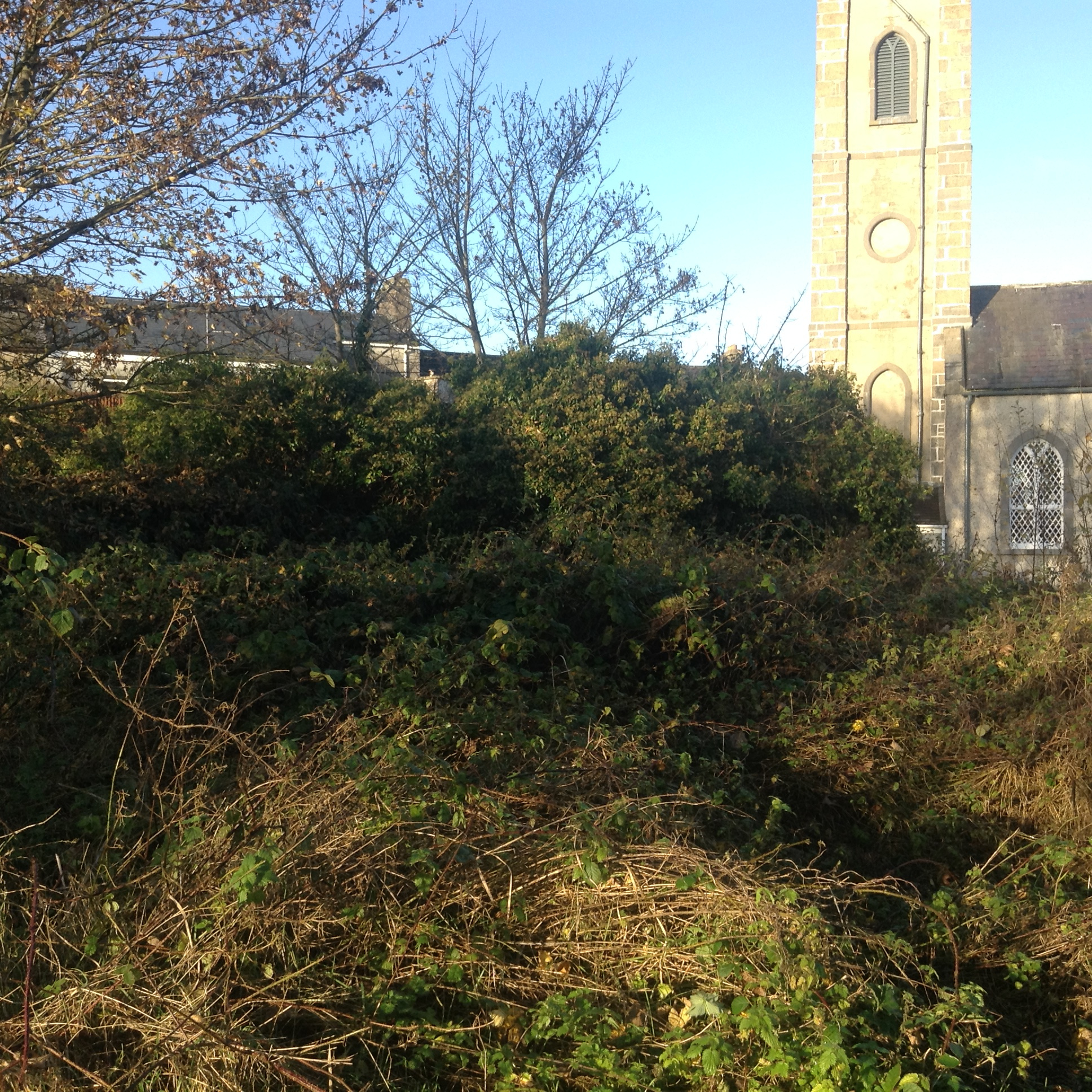
Monastery of Mohill, ruins of the "old school house" under thick ivy.

From 1540 the English were forcefully suppressing Monasteries throughout Ireland, (Note: The Annals of the Four Masters records- "1540: The English, throughout every part of Ireland where they extended their power, were persecuting and banishing the Orders, and particularly they destroyed the monastery of Monaghan, and beheaded the guardian, and some of the friars". This refers to the Franciscan Friary in county Monaghan and not the Augustinian Priory at Mohill in county Leitrim.) and "the end of the sixteenth century [was] a bad time for priests and papists". Some sources suggest the monastery was suppressed as late as 1621, however Mohill was described as the "Queens's manor" consisting of 'about six quarters' in as 1583, and in 1590 "an immense" english army occupied Mohill and routed the "Muintir Eolais" chieftains.

The "late monastery of Moghill" was divided between Edward Barrett c. 1592, and Terence O'Byrne of Muintir Eolais c. 1594. (Note: "1592: Grant to Edward Barrett of ... parcel of the possessions of the late religious house of Moghill in county Longford", which consisted of Lisdadanan, Coolabaun, Tullybradan, Cappagh, Gortfadda, and Drumcroy. Secondly in "1594: Grant to Terence, alias Tirlaughe O'Byrne, of ... the site and precinct of the late monastery of Moghill, with all its possessions, including the rectory". Note: The O'Beirne's were a sept of Muintir Eolais.) Barret's parcel subsequently passing to an englishman named John Crofton c. 1594, who bequeathed same to his son Henry by a deed dated 2 June 1607. On dissolution, the Priory possessions were the townlands of Tullybradan, Coolabaun, Gortfadda, and Drumcroy, totaling c. 160 – c. 240acres, a church, two stone buildings, and the cemetery.

"near the end of the sixteenth century. A bad time it was for priests and papists"

— John O'Hart, Irish pedigrees, 1892, page 414.

== Revival ==
Confederate Ireland rule was established c. 1642 – c. 1649, and during the Eleven Years' War the Priory of Mohill was re-established in some manner. Ecclesiastical documents record Canon Antony Mag Raghnaill, otherwise Reynolds, being appointed Prior of Maothail-Manchain on 21 August 1648.

== Final suppression, 1649–1653 ==
The priory was suppressed again during the devastating Cromwellian conquest of Ireland c. 1649 – c. 1653.

== Heritage ==
Priory clergy were expelled and risked execution under the Penal Laws. In 1666, four Reynolds priests (James, Loghlin, Richard, Walter) are among "forty nine Catholics from hiding places in the woods" in County Roscommon, who signed a letter in support of the Pope and protesting the loss of their 'due liberties'. And in 1713 an elderly Father Connor Reynolds "of Jamestown in the county of Leitrim" who had been exiled in Spain since 1681, was captured hiding in a trunk on a fishing boat arriving at Dungarvan port and imprisoned at Waterford jail.

Today nothing survives of the early ecclesiastical site here, except for an inaccessible old school-house, and the base of a round tower located near the old persons home in the town. The remains of the abbey or sanctuary forms the south, and east, walls of the Hyde family vault in the graveyard of 'Saint Mary's church' later built on the Priory ruins. The Croftons also built an old Castle at Rinn Lough from the ruins of Mohill Priory, as small free stones of the same class were evidenced in each. There may be other undocumented ruins on the wider monastic site, though it's not classed as a national monument or heritage site.

== See also ==
- Charles Reynolds
- Muintir Eolais
- Conmhaicne
- Mohill (barony)

== Notes and references ==
=== Primary sources ===
- Whelan, Michael. "Monastery at Mohill".
- Mohill Parish. "Mohill Parish" (Online ed.).
- Slevin, Tina (1999–2003). "A very basic history of Mohill and South Leitrim!". mohill.com.

=== Secondary sources ===
==== Annals ====
- Bambury, Pádraig (2008). "Annála Connacht" (Electronic edition compiled by the CELT Team (2001)(2008) ed.). CELT: Corpus of Electronic Texts: a project of University College Cork College Road, Cork, Ireland. p. 1473.47.
- Balé, Marcos; Purcell, Emer (2008). "The Annals of Ulster" (Electronic edition compiled by the CELT Team (2003)(2010), 2nd draft ed.). CELT: Corpus of Electronic Texts: a project of University College Cork College Road, Cork, Ireland. pp. U1486.9.
- Hennessy, William M. (2008). "Annals of Lough Ce" (Electronic edition compiled by the CELT Team (2002)(2008) ed.). CELT: Corpus of Electronic Texts: a project of University College Cork College Road, Cork, Ireland. pp. LC1137.10.
- Mac Niocaill, Gearóid (2010). The Annals of Tigernach. CELT online at University College, Cork, Ireland.: Dublin : Printed for the Irish Archaeological and Celtic Society by A. Thom. p. 1.
- O'Clery, Michael; et al. (1846). The Annals of the Four Masters. Translated by Owen Connellan. Dublin: Bryan Geraghty.
- O'Donovan, John, ed. (1856). Annála Rioghachta Éireann. Annals of the Kingdom of Ireland by the Four Masters ... with a Translation and Copious Notes. 7 vols. Translated by O'Donovan (2nd ed.). Dublin: Royal Irish Academy. CELT editions. Full scans at Internet Archive: Vol. 1; Vol. 2; Vol. 3; Vol. 4; Vol. 5; Vol. 6; Indices.

==== Ecclesiastical sources ====
- Bliss; Twemlow (1904a). "Calendar of Papal Registers Relating To Great Britain and Ireland" (Lateran Regesta 55: 1397–1398 ed.). His Majesty's Stationery Office. pp. 103–107.
- Bliss; Twemlow (1904b). "Calendar of Papal Registers Relating To Great Britain and Ireland" (Lateran Regesta 81: 1399–1401 ed.). His Majesty's Stationery Office. pp. 321–337.
- Bliss; Twemlow (1904c). "Calendar of Papal Registers Relating To Great Britain and Ireland" (Lateran Regesta 163: 1412–1413 ed.). His Majesty's Stationery Office. pp. 366–370.
- Bliss; Twemlow (1904d). "Calendar of Papal Registers Relating To Great Britain and Ireland" (Lateran Regesta 166: 1412–1413 ed.). His Majesty's Stationery Office. pp. 387–397.
- Bliss; Twemlow (1906). "Calendar of Papal Registers Relating To Great Britain and Ireland" (Lateran Regesta 166: 1417–1418 ed.). His Majesty's stationery Office. pp. 77–88.
- Burke, William P (1914). The Irish priests in the penal times (1660–1760) [microform]: from the state papers in H. M. Record Offices, Dublin and London, the Bodleian Library, and the British Museum (PDF). [S.l. : s.n.]
- Catholic Record Society of Ireland (1912). Archivium hibernicum; or, Irish historical records (PDF). Vol. I. Shannon : Irish University Press for the Catholic Record Society of Ireland.
- Costello, Michael A.; Coleman, Ambrose; Flood, William Henry Grattan (1909). De annatis Hiberniæ: a calendar of the first fruits' fees levied on papal appointments to benefices in Ireland A.D. 1400 to 1535 extracted from the Vatican and other roman archives with copious topographical notes together with summaries of papal rescripts relating to benefices in Ireland and biographical notes of the bishops of Irish sees during the same period (PDF). pp. 160, 165.
- Jennings, Brendan (1959). "Ecclesiastical Appointments in Ireland, Aug. 1643 – Dec. 1649". Collectanea Hibernica. Collectanea Hibernica No. 2 (2). Franciscan Province of Ireland: 18–65. JSTOR 30004525.
- Monahan, John (1886). Records relating to the dioceses of Ardagh and Clonmacnoise (PDF) (Forgotten Books, copyright 2016 FB&c Ltd. ed.). Dublin: M. H. Gill and Son, O'Connell Street. pp. 353, 380.
- Murray, L. P. (1936). "Archbishop Cromer's Register. (Continued)". Journal of the County Louth Archaeological Society. 8 (4). County Louth Archaeological and History Society: 322–351. doi:10.2307/27728434. JSTOR 27728434.
- Twemlow, J A (1909). Calendar of Papal Registers Relating To Great Britain and Ireland. Vol. 8, 1427–1447 (Lateran Regesta 319: 1431–1433 ed.). His Majesty's stationery Office. pp. 456–467.
- Twemlow, J A (1933). "Rubricelle of Lost Registers". Calendar of Papal Registers Relating To Great Britain and Ireland. Vol. 12, 1458–1471. London: His Majesty's Stationery Office. pp. xx–xxxix – via British History Online.
- Twemlow, J A (1955a). Calendar of Papal Registers Relating To Great Britain and Ireland. Vol. 13, 1471–1484 (Lateran Regesta 741: 1475 ed.). His Majesty's stationery Office. pp. 387–388.
- Twemlow, J A (1955b). Calendar of Papal Registers Relating To Great Britain and Ireland. Vol. 13, 1471–1484 (Lateran Regesta 783: 1478 ed.). His Majesty's stationery Office. pp. 605–609.
- Twemlow, J A (1955c). Calendar of Papal Registers Relating To Great Britain and Ireland. Vol. 13, 1471–1484 (Lateran Regesta 787: 1478 ed.). His Majesty's stationery Office. pp. 621–622.
- Twemlow, J A (1955d). "Index of Persons and Places: M, N, O". Calendar of Papal Registers Relating To Great Britain and Ireland. Vol. 13, 1471–1484. London: His Majesty's stationery Office. pp. 1081–1145 – via British History Online.

==== Miscellaneous sources ====
- John Cronin & Associates (2005). Archaeological & Built Heritage Assessment (PDF) (Report). Vol. Waterways Corridor Study: The Upper Shannon Navigation – Boyle River Navigation to Roosky including Lough Allen, Lough Key and the Carnadoe Waters. Colin Buchanan & Partners. Archived from the original (PDF) on 28 April 2016.
- Crofton, Henry Thomas (1911). Crofton memoirs, an account of John Crofton, of Ballymurry, Co. Roscommon: Queen Elizabeth's escheator-general of Ireland, and of his ancestors and descendants, and others bearing the name (from Public and Private Records ed.). Yorkshire printing company.
- Duffy, Seán, ed. (2005). Medieval Ireland: An Encyclopedia. Vol. Routledge Encyclopedias of the Middle Ages. Routledge. ISBN 1-135-94824-0.
- Debretts (1824). Debrett's baronetage, knightage, and companionage (PDF). Vol. 2 (5 ed.). London, Odhams Press. p. 986.
- Haley, Gene C. (2002). "Tamlachta: The Map of Plague Burials and Some Implications for Early Irish History". Proceedings of the Harvard Celtic Colloquium. 22. Department of Celtic Languages & Literatures, Harvard University: 96–140. JSTOR 40285165.
- Hanley, Gerald (1961). "Nicholas Mahon and 17th Century Roscommon". New England Historic Genealogical Society in Boston.
- Hynes, John (1931). "St. Caillin". The Journal of the Royal Society of Antiquaries of Ireland. 1 (1). Royal Society of Antiquaries of Ireland, 1931: 39–54. JSTOR 25513584.
- Ireland (1843). James Hardiman (ed.). A Statute of the Fortieth Year of King Edward III: Enacted in a Parliament Held in Kilkenny, A. D. 1367, Before Lionel Duke of Clarence. Vol. 2 (Original from Oxford University, Digitized 11 Sep 2007 ed.). Irish Archaeological Society.
- Keating, Geoffrey (1902). The History Of Ireland (PDF). Vol. I. The Irish Texts Society.
- M'Parlan, James (1802). Statistical Survey of the County Leitrim,: With Observations on the Means of Improvement; Drawn Up for the Consideration, and by Order of the Dublin Society (Digitized 2014 ed.). Graisberry & Campbell.
- MacNeill, John (1909). "Ogham Inscription at Cloonmorris, Co. Leitrim" (PDF). The Journal of the Royal Society of Antiquaries of Ireland. Fifth series. XXXIX. Royal Society of Antiquaries of Ireland: 132–136.
- Morrin, James (1862). Calendar of the Patent and Close Rolls of Chancery in Ireland, of the Reigns of Henry VIII., Edward VI., Mary, and Elizabeth ...: 1576–1602. Vol. II (digitized 2008 from Harvard University ed.). Ireland. Chancery.: A. Thom & sons.
- Murray, L. P. (December 1929). Joseph T. Dolan (ed.). "A Calendar of the Register of Primate George Dowdall, Commonly Called the "Liber Niger" or "Black Book"". Journal of the County Louth Archaeological Society. 6 (4). County Louth Archaeological and History Society: 213–228. doi:10.2307/27728265. JSTOR 27728258.
- National Monuments Service (2009). "Leitrim" (PDF). National Monuments in State Care: Ownership & Guardianship (Report). Environment, Heritage and Local Government.
- O'Hanlon, John (1875). Lives of the Irish Saints: with special festivals, and the commemorations of holy persons (PDF). Dublin: J. Duffy.
- O'Hart, John (1892). Irish pedigrees; or, The origin and stem of the Irish nation (PDF). Dublin, J. Duffy and Co.; New York, Benziger Brothers.
- Redknap, Mark; et al., eds. (2001). Pattern and Purpose in Insular Art: Proceedings of the Fourth International Conference on Insular Art Held at the National Museum & Gallery, Cardiff 3–6 September 1998 (illustrated ed.). Oxbow. ISBN 978-1-84217-058-8.
- Richter, Michael (2005). Medieval Ireland: The Enduring Tradition. Gill & Macmillan. ISBN 978-0-7171-3293-5.
- Woods, J. Douglas; Pelteret, David A.E., eds. (2010). The Anglo-Saxons: Synthesis and Achievement (revised ed.). Wilfrid Laurier Univ. Press. ISBN 978-1-55458-824-4.
