= Mawgan =

Mawgan and Meugan (also Meigant) (Latin: Mauganus) are names referring to either one or two Brythonic saints who flourished in the 5th or 6th century. Both names are widely attested in place-names and church dedications, Mawgan in Cornwall and Brittany and Meugan in Wales, but it is uncertain whether the names refer to one and the same person. The parishes of St Mawgan and Mawgan-in-Meneage in Cornwall derive their names from Mauganus. There is also a Machan in West Lothian (Scotland), as shown by the place-name Ecclesmachan, but again this may be a distinct figure.

No hagiographical Life survives for Mawgan or Meugan, but figures bearing Latinised versions of either of these names appear in the Lives of Cadog and David. A saint called Maucan or Moucan features in an episode of the late 11th-century Life of Cadog, in which he arbitrates a quarrel between Cadog and Maelgwn, king of Gwynedd. A Life of David, also of the late 11th century, refers to a monastery of Mawgan (Latin: Maucannus). The "Mostyn Manuscript No. 88", in the National Library of Wales, records several Meugan festivals, including Manchan of Mohill.

Later still, Meugan is mentioned in the Welsh genealogical collection known as Bonedd y Saint, which details the lineages of Welsh saints. The relevant section has been dated to c. 1510.

== See also ==
- Mannacus
- Meneage
