= Kilmanahan =

Townland in County Waterford, Ireland

Coordinates: 52.3165°N 7.7773°W

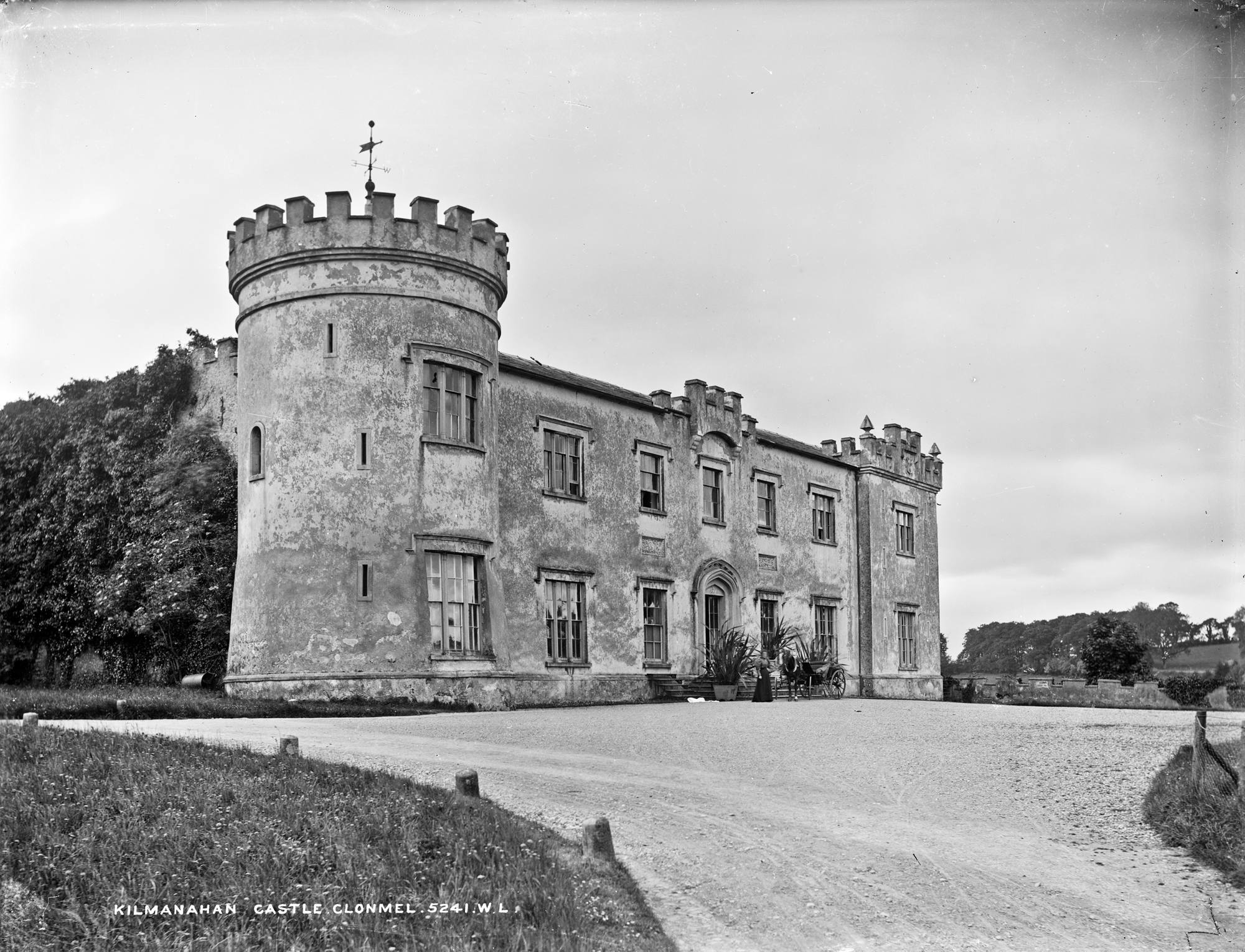
Kilmanahan Castle (now in ruin)

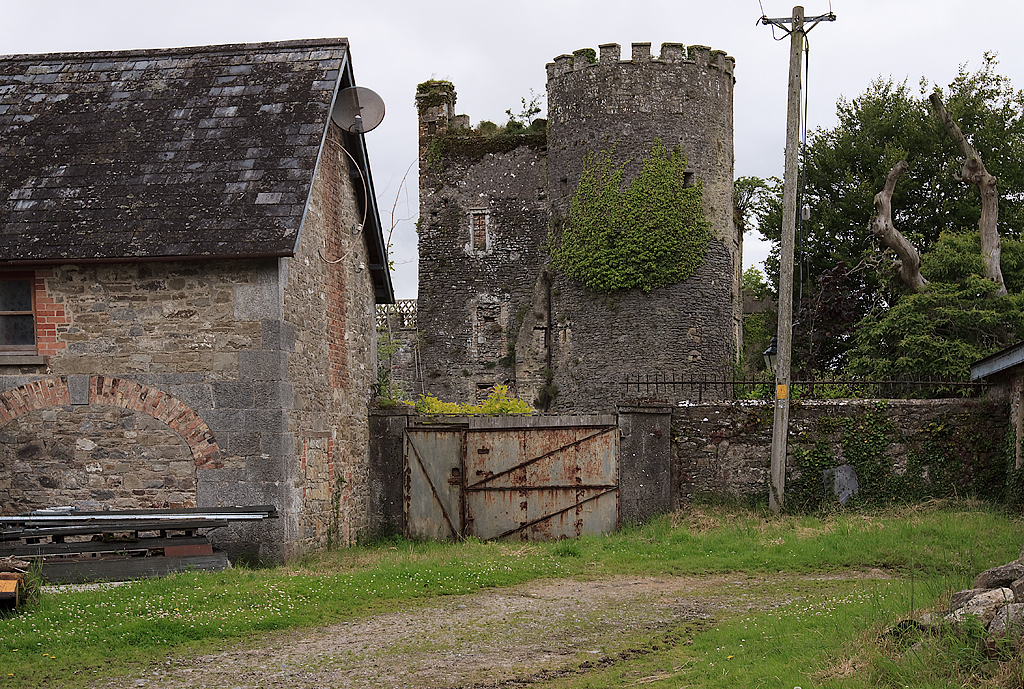
Kilmanahan Castle incorporates parts of an earlier tower house

Kilmanahan (Irish: Cill Mhainchín) is a townland in the historical barony of Glenahiry in County Waterford, Ireland. The townland, which has an area of approximately 2.75 square kilometres (1.06 sq mi), had a population of 40 people as of the 2011 census.

A church, traditionally associated with Saint Mainchin and which gives the area its name, was formerly located in the townland. The nearby Kilmanahan Castle, a Georgian manor house incorporating the structure of an earlier tower house, is sometimes associated with the Greene family.
