= William Carrigan =

Irish Roman Catholic priest and historian

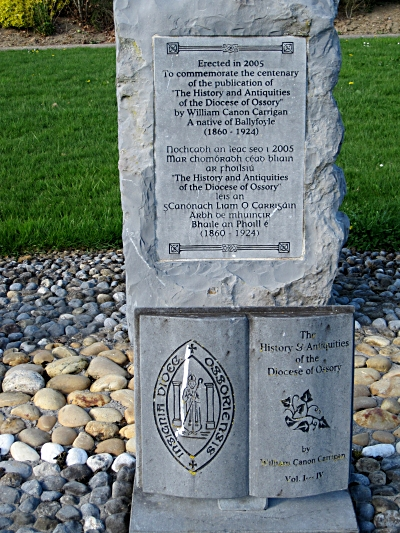
Memorial to Rev William Carrigan in Ballyfoyle, County Kilkenny

William Carrigan MRIA (29 August 1860 – 12 December 1924) was an Irish Roman Catholic priest and historian, who was appointed canon of the Diocese of Ossory.

== Early life ==
William Carrigan was the youngest of 13 children. He was born in 1860 in Ruthstown, Ballyfoyle, County Kilkenny.

He received his childhood education in the Ballyfoyle National School and then in Wellington Square in Kilkenny City. He then attended the ecclesiastical side of St Kieran's College. His education was continued at St. Patrick's College, Maynooth today alongside the larger NUI Maynooth. He was ordained by Francis Moran, Bishop of Ossory, in 1884. His first posting was as curate in Ballyragget. Bishop Moran was a distinguished historian, having founded the Ossory Archaeological Society in 1872. He encouraged William's interests in history and he joined the Ossory Archaeological Society in 1884; his first paper was printed in the last issue of the Ossory Archaeological Society in 1886.

== Sources and origins of his works ==
The 19th century saw a great interest in history. Kilkenny had already seen two major historical works published in 1884, John Hogan's History of Kilkenny etc. and P. M. Egan's Illustrated Guide to the City and County of Kilkenny. The clergy played an active role in these developments; the Rev. James Graves, an Anglican cleric and antiquarian, was a frequent contributor to the Kilkenny Archaeological Society (renamed in 1890 to Royal Society of Antiquaries of Ireland). Carrigan with his high interest in local history took these developments as reason to create his own writings. The Bishop of Ossory, Dr Brownrigg, encouraged Carrigan to begin a compilation of a history of Ossory. The Bishop would fund his travels and subscribe to the finished works.

Carrigan travelled around the diocese speaking at great length to older people, taking count of folklore traditions and oral history. We owe it to Carrigan that we still have these today. He also trudged through existing works and resolved conflicting accounts. All of his holidays were spent in the Public Records Office, Dublin, collecting information that related to Ossory.

== The History and Antiquities of Ossory ==
William Carrigan was 45 when The History and Antiquities of Ossory was completed. The finished work, divided into four volumes, took six years in the writing, between 1897 and 1903. The first volume deals with the overall history of the diocese from Pre-Christianity Celtic times to the Christianisation and through the Past Bishops and Clergy. The remaining volumes examine Ossory's parishes. It explains each parish's buildings, churches, castles, monuments etc. Townlands are also examined and the origins of their names explained as well as prominent families and tombstone inscriptions etc. Interwoven throughout his narrative in the first volume, is a history of the Kingdom of Ossory and the activity of its rulers, gentry and major clergy; complete with as many annalistic references and other primary sources as he could compile.

Illustrations add to in the richness of his work; photography is used to its full extent. The firm chosen to print the work was Sealy, Bryer and Walker of Middle Abbey Street, Dublin. The firm had long experience of printing historical works. 738 individuals subscribed to the work. 840 copies were sold; the remaining 160 were lost in Dublin during the 1916 Rising. The work was well received on its publication and although other diocesan histories exist, none come to par with it for its range and depth.

== Later life ==
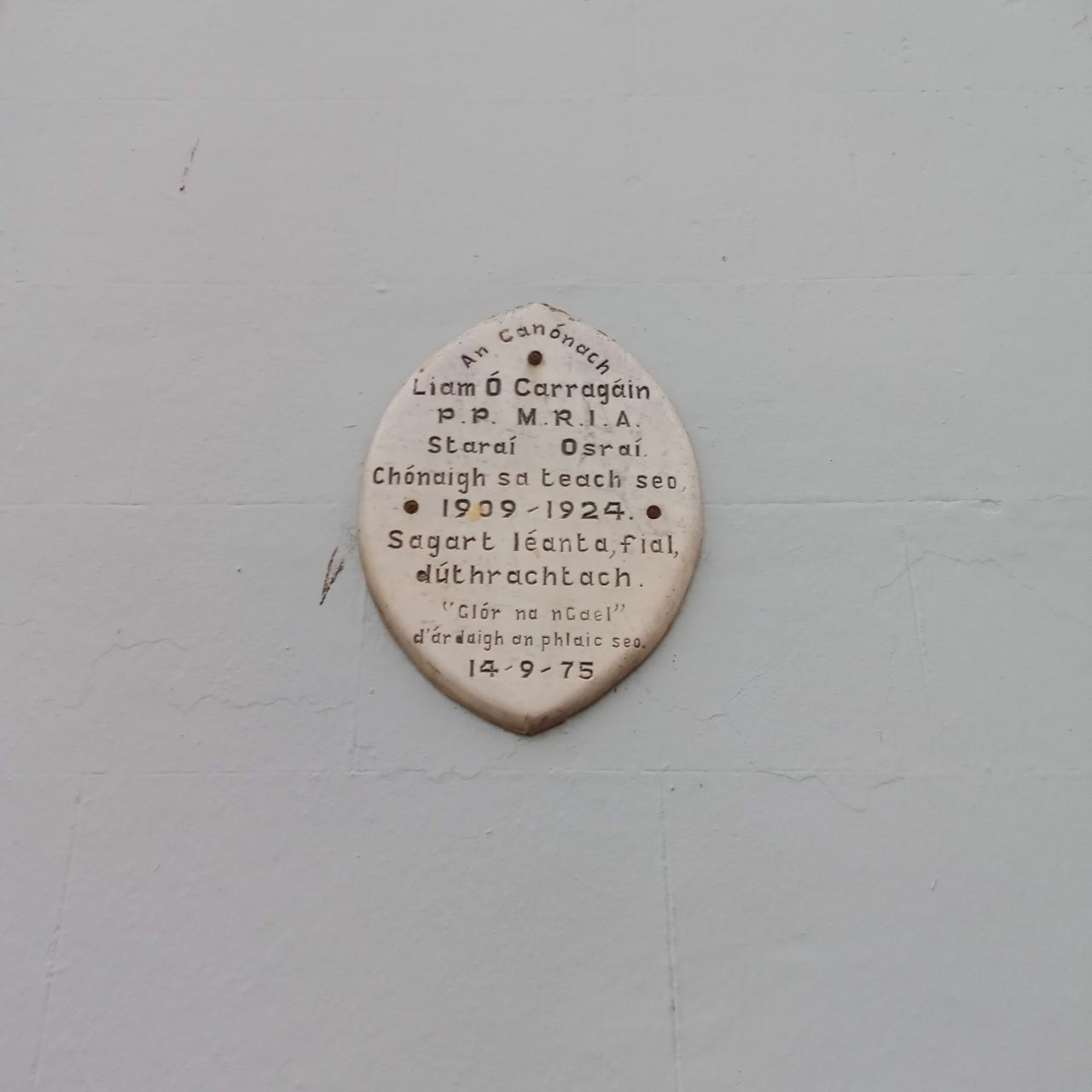
Plaque to Carrigan in Durrow

Carrigan was created D.D. by the Pope in 1907. He was appointed parish priest of Durrow, County Laois in 1911. He continued to write and collect material; a further volume was planned but was never published. His unpublished works are preserved in the Diocesan Archives in St Kieran's College. Canon Carrigan died on 12 December 1924 as a result of contracting influenza.

== See also ==
- Kingdom of Ossory
- Upper Ossory
