= Mainchín of Limerick =

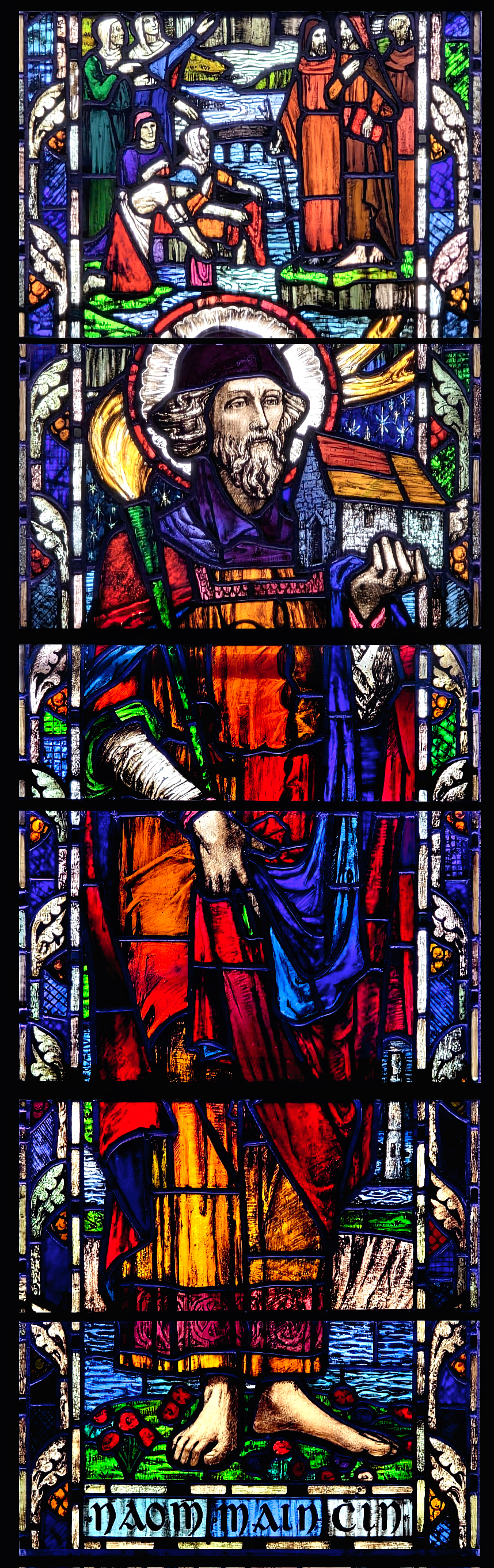
- St. Munchin by Catherine O'Brien at the Honan Chapel
- Born: Mainchín mac Setnai
- Feast: 2 January

Mainchín mac Setnai (fl. late 6th century), also anglicised to Munchin, was allegedly the founder of the church of Luimneach (now Limerick), Ireland, and a saint in Irish tradition, acquiring special eminence as patron of Limerick City. Both his origins and the date of his association with the city are debated.

== Background ==
Through his father Sétna, Mainchín is alleged to belong to the Dál Cais, given a pedigree linking him to the ancestors of the O'Brien dynasty. His tutor was the Corco Mruad saint Mac Creiche according to the Life of that saint. Mainchín is said to have founded Luimneach when Ferdomnach, king from the Dál Cais, granted him land at Inis Sibtond.

A major problem with the above is that the Dál Cais themselves are unknown by that name before the 930s and are believed by scholars to be the descendants of a Déisi population which migrated into the region at an uncertain period. Before the Dál Cais, the greater region appears to have been dominated for a time by another people entirely, the Uí Fidgenti, who eventually found themselves much displaced by the Dál Cais in the second half of the 10th century and following, although after having previously overrun many of the Déisi themselves in the very same territories.

== Brug Ríg ==
Mainchín is also the patron saint of Brug Ríg, now Bruree, the former royal seat of the Uí Fidgenti.

== Limerick ==
It has been argued that his appearance in Limerick is actually due to his adoption by the later Norse there, with whom the O'Donovan family, late representatives of the kingdom (although of uncertain origins themselves), were closely associated.

In fact, no "successors" of Mainchín in Limerick are known before the 12th century and so his existence there cannot be verified before then.

In the Martyrology of Donegal, Mainchín's feast day occurs on 29 December. In Bruree, his feast day is commemorated on 2 January, but this date may have been erroneously taken from that recorded for St Manchán (Manchéne) of Min Droichit in the Félire Óengusso. The Roman Martyrology also lists 2 January as Mainchín of Limerick's memorial.

== See also ==
- St. Munchin's College
