= James Charles Wall =

British historian

James Charles Wall (AKA J. Charles Wall, J. C. Wall) (1860–1943) was a British ecclesiologist, historian, and Fellow of the Royal Historical Society in the late 19th and early 20th century. He wrote many books, mainly on Church history, and was an early contributor to the Victoria History of the Counties of England project. He was born in Shoreditch on 15 July 1860 to James Wall and Mary Wall née Williams. He attended Westminster School and New College, Oxford.

He was the uncle of the writer Charles Williams.

== Bibliography ==
- The Tombs of the Kings of England, Sampson Low, Marston & Company, London, (1891)
- Alfred the Great: His Abbeys of Hyde, Athelney and Shaftesbury, (1900)
- Devils - Their Origins and History, Willian Brendon and Sons, Plymouth, (1904)
- Shrines Of British Saints, (1905)
- Shrines of the English Saints, (1905)
- An Old English Parish, (1907)
- Ancient Earthworks, (1908)
- Relics Of The Passion, (1910)
- Porches and Fonts. Wells Gardner, Darton and Co., London (1912)
- The Church Chests of Essex, (1913, co-authored with H. W. Lewer)
- Medieval Wall Paintings, (1914)
- The First Christians of Britain, (1920)
- Pilgrimage, (1925)
- The Devil in Art
