= St Machan =

Scottish saint

Saint Machan
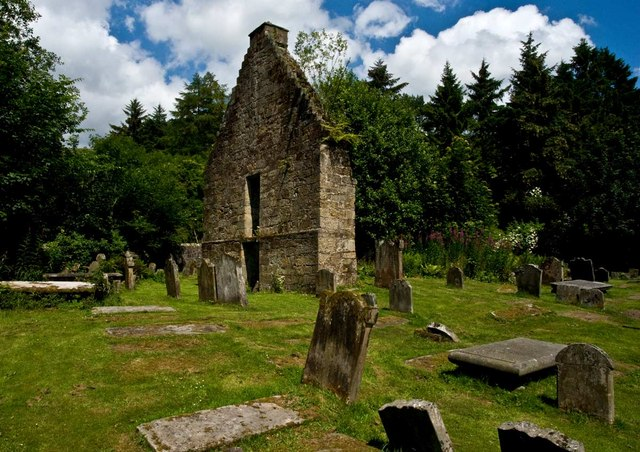
- St Machan's Chapel, Campsie Glen

Bishop
- Born: Scotland
- Died: circa 1175; Clachan of Campsie
- Venerated in: Roman Catholic Church
- Feast: 18 and 28 September

Machan or Machanus was a twelfth-century Scottish saint. He was educated in Ireland and was ordained as a bishop in Rome. He is known for his missionary work around Clachan of Campsie (or Campsie Glen), near Glasgow. Machan built a small chapel at the bottom of the glen. After his death, in 1175 a church was built over his grave.

In 1859 there was a St. Machan's Well at Campsie, but no trace now remains.

Most information about St Machan is lost. However, his name remains in the name of the village of Ecclesmachan in West Lothian.
