= Manchán of Min Droichit =

Irish scholar and abbot (d. c. 652)

Manchán of Min Droichit (a.k.a. Manchéne, Manchianus died c. 652) was an Irish scholar and Abbot.

== Biography ==
Manchán Latin: Maencha was an Irish scholar and abbot of Irish: Min Droichit, Meanadroichit, now Mondrehid, in the barony of Upper Ossory, County Offaly. His name is also attached to Dissert Gallen, Co. Laois.

Manchán twice makes his appearance in Latin sources as a scholar whose authority still mattered after his death. First, he is probably the Manchianus, called pater and sapiens, who is named by an anonymous Irishman in his preface to the De mirabilibus sacrae scripturae ('On the miraculous things in sacred scripture'), written in 655 and so shortly after Manchán's death. The author, who uses the nom de plume Augustine and is for this reason known today as the Irish Pseudo-Augustine, appears to have been a pupil of Manchán as well as of one Eusebius.

Second, Manchán may be the 'M., doctor noster' who is cited in a Hiberno-Latin commentary on the Catholic Epistles for his exegetical views on the Epistle of James. This anonymous work is uniquely preserved in a manuscript now held at Karlsruhe (Germany), but once in the possession of Reichenau Abbey. The glosses also cite a number of 7th-century Irish scholars, including Laidcenn mac Buith Bannaig, Breccanus, Banbán and Bercanus mac Áed, who are known to have been associated with Cumméne Fota (Cummianus).

He is probably the Manchan referenced as "Patronus de Coolcasheen, S. Manihinns, Conf.. 2 Jau." in the diocese of Ossory, now St. Munchin's Church, who is claimed to be son of Moenacli, according to the 'Book of Lenister'. The Manchín feast day commemorated on 2 January in Irish martyrologies probably identifies him, with this feast day shared by the likely identical Manchan of Coolcashin, and the contemporary Mainchín of Luimnech, whose festival is otherwise recorded on 29 December.

== Death ==
The death of Manchán falls between 648 and 652 according to the Irish Annals-

- Annals of Clonmacnoise "A.D. 648, Maincheni, Abbot of Meanadrochit, died".
- Annals of the Four Masters "A.D. 649, Manchinus abbot of Menadrochatt, died".
- Annals of Ulster "Latin: A.D. 651, Dormitatio Maencha in Abbatis Menodrochit. Imarie Cuile coire, in qua cecidit Culene ac Forindain, Maeldeich et Onchu victores erant".
- Annals of Tigernach "A.D. 652, The falling asleep of Manchéne, abbot of Monadrehid".

== See also ==
- Caolánn
- Cumméne Fota
- Blessed Marianus Scotus
- John Whitehead (theologian)

== Primary sources ==
- Breen, Aidan (2010). "Manchán, Manchianus, Manchíne". Dictionary of Irish Biography. Cambridge University Press. Retrieved 6 February 2010.
- Ó Cróinín, Dáibhí (1995). Early Medieval Ireland: 400–1200. London: Longman. ISBN 0-582-01565-0.
- Óengus of Tallaght (1905). Stokes, Whitley (ed.). The Martyrology of Oengus the Culdee. Henry Bradshaw Society. Vol. 29. London.
- Carrigan, William (1905). The history and antiquities of the diocese of Ossory (PDF). Internet Archive is non-profit library of millions of free books, and more.: Dublin : Sealy, Bryers & Walker. p. 334.

== Secondary sources ==
- O'Donovan, John, ed. (1856). Annála Rioghachta Éireann. Annals of the Kingdom of Ireland by the Four Masters ... with a Translation and Copious Notes. 7 vols. Translated by O'Donovan (2nd ed.). Dublin: Royal Irish Academy. CELT editions. Full scans at Internet Archive: Vol. 1; Vol. 2; Vol. 3; Vol. 4; Vol. 5; Vol. 6; Indices.
- Mageoghagan, Conell; Murphy, Denis (1896). The Annals of Clonmacnoise; being annals of Ireland, from the earliest period to A. D. 1408 (PDF) (Translated into English A. D. 1627 ed.). Dublin: University Press for the Royal Society of Antiquaries of Ireland.
- Bambury, Pádraig; Beechinor, Stephen (2000). "The Annals of Ulster" (Electronic edition compiled by the CELT Team (2000) ed.). CELT: Corpus of Electronic Texts: a project of University College Cork College Road, Cork, Ireland—http://www.ucc.ie/celt. pp. U536.3, U539.1, U545.1.
- Mac Niocaill, Gearóid (2010). The Annals of Tigernach. CELT online at University College, Cork, Ireland.: Dublin : Printed for the Irish Archaeological and Celtic Society by A. Thom. p. 1.
