= James Graves (antiquarian) =

Irish clergyman, antiquary and archaeologist

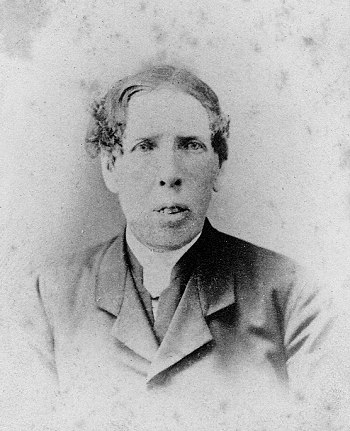
- Born: 11 October 1816; Kilkenny, Ireland
- Died: 20 March 1886
- Education: Trinity College, Dublin
- Known for: clergyman, antiquary and archaeologist
- Parent: Richard Graves

James Graves (11 October 1816 – 20 March 1886 was an Irish clergyman, antiquary and archaeologist of the Victorian era.

== Life ==
A native of Kilkenny, James's father, Richard Graves (himself a reverend), kept a school in the city, and James himself was born on St Canice's day, 11 October. He stated his nurse regretted he had not been named Kenny, after the patron saint to whom he thus had a double allegiance. He went to Trinity College, Dublin in 1834, from where he graduated with a Bachelor of Arts (BA) in 1839. He was ordained in 1840 and appointed curate to Skeirke in County Laois. He rapidly obtained preferment, and as curate of St Patrick's Kilkenny, was attached as Treasurer to St Canice's Cathedral, before gaining a living in the county. In 1863 he was appointed to the parish of Ennisnag (Inisnag). Although married, he had no children. He had an interest in plants which found expression in his collection of ferns, a geologist and apiarian.

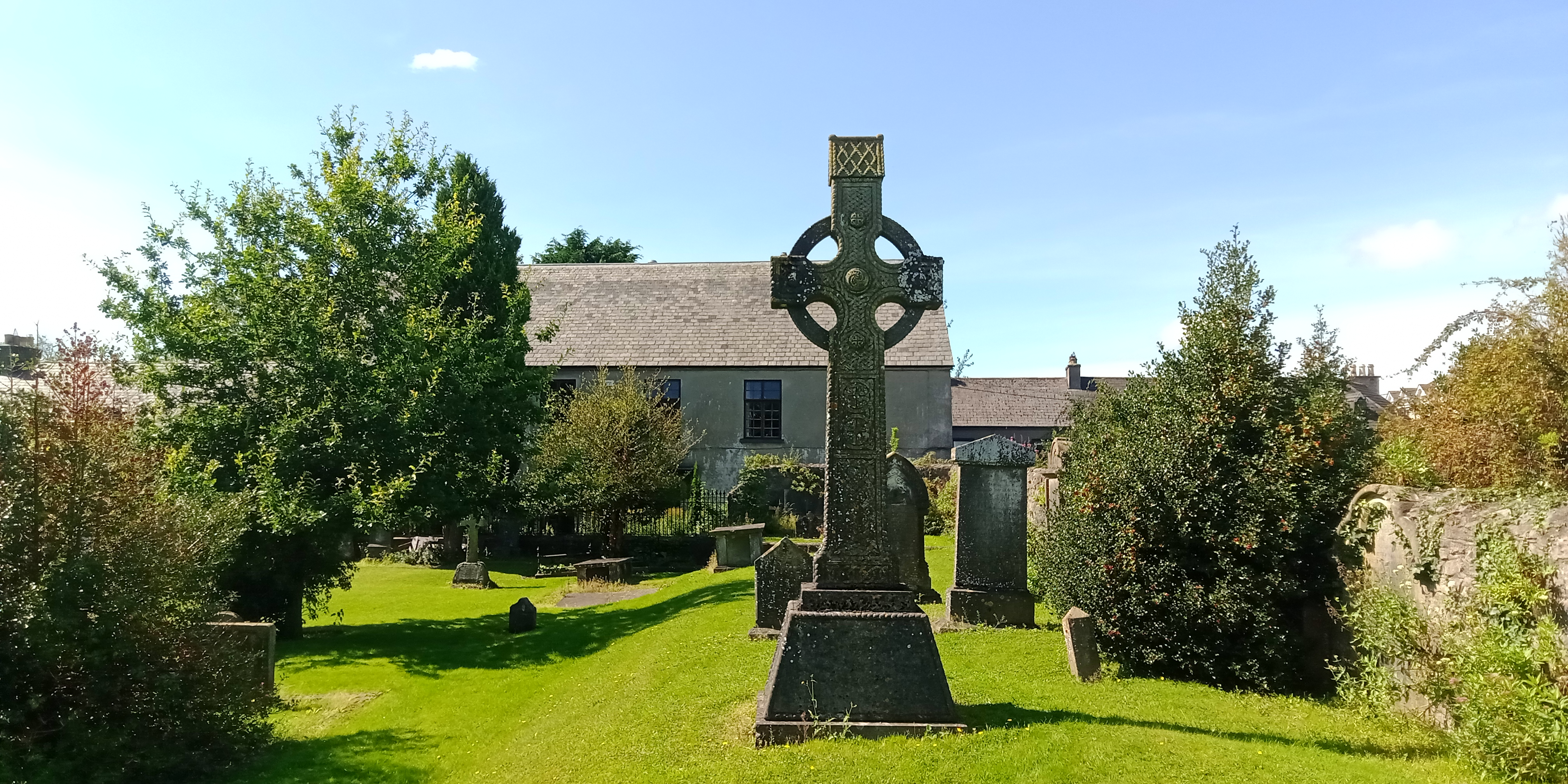
Grave of James Graves in St. Canice's Cathedral graveyard

His fame rests in his antiquarian and archaeological interests, rather than in his clerical pursuits. A close friend of John O'Donovan, he was also acquainted with George Petrie, and like them devoted his life towards the preservation of the antiquities of his native country. His main point of interest however was the architecture of his own city and county, and his interests therefore were focussed not on the pre-Norman period of Irish history but on the period from circa 1169 onward. In particular, he was responsible for the careful conservation work on St Canice's cathedral in Kilkenny city, while he was treasurer, and in the 1860s and 1870s he worked through the Royal Society of Antiquaries of Ireland, of which he was himself a founding member, when it was founded as the Kilkenny Archaeological Society, towards the conservation of several important ruined medieval churches.

Although he is never accorded the degree of fame as a founding father of Irish archaeology which is given to Petrie, his effort towards the preservation of medieval Irish buildings was highly significant. In particular, as a respectable Anglican clergyman, he was able to gain the ear of the establishment more easily than some of his Catholic contemporaries. This proved of importance after the disestablishment of the Church of Ireland left many then ruinous church sites in an ambiguous position, which was rectified by their being taken into state care as National Monuments.

== Bibliography ==
- Graves, James (1849). "Ancient Timber Structures". Transactions of the Kilkenny Archaeological Society. 1 (1): 33. JSTOR 41576089. (possibly hinting at water mills)
- Graves, James (1849). "Miscellaneous Antiquities". Transactions of the Kilkenny Archaeological Society. 1 (1): 91–94. JSTOR 41576100. (about the banner found in Rothe House)
- Graves, James (1850). "Ancient Irish Stained Glass". Transactions of the Kilkenny Archaeological Society. 1 (2): 210–214. JSTOR 25554923.
- Graves, James (1850). "The Ancient Tribes and Territories of Ossory. No. I". Transactions of the Kilkenny Archaeological Society. 1 (2): 230–247. JSTOR 25554927.
- Graves, James (1850). "Crom-Leac". Transactions of the Kilkenny Archaeological Society. 1 (2): 129–132. JSTOR 25554910.
- Graves, James (1850). "The Bay and Town of Bannow. No. I". Transactions of the Kilkenny Archaeological Society. 1 (2): 187–194. JSTOR 25554921.
- Graves, James (1851). "Extracts from the Household Expenses of James Earl of Ossory". Transactions of the Kilkenny Archaeological Society. 1 (3): 415–419. JSTOR 25489794.
- Graves, James (1851). "On the Supposed Pelasgian Inscription of Tory Hill". Transactions of the Kilkenny Archaeological Society. 1 (3): 300–304. JSTOR 25489780.
- Graves, James (1851). "Observations on the Excavation of a Carn at Cloghmanty Hill". Transactions of the Kilkenny Archaeological Society. 1 (3): 289–294. JSTOR 25489777.
- Graves, James (1852). "The Ancient Fabric, Plate, and Furniture of the Cathedral of Christ Church, Waterford; Illustrated by Original Documents Supplied by the Very Rev. Edward Newenham Hoare, D.D., Dean of Waterford". Transactions of the Kilkenny Archaeological Society. 2 (1): 75–83. JSTOR 25489814.
- Graves, James (1852). "Ancient Tapestry of Kilkenny Castle". Transactions of the Kilkenny Archaeological Society. 2 (1): 3–9. JSTOR 25489807.
- Graves, James (1852). "On the Cross-Legged Effigies of the County of Kilkenny". Transactions of the Kilkenny Archaeological Society. 2 (1): 63–64, 67–70. JSTOR 25489812.
- Graves, James (1853). "The Pagan Cemetery at Ballon Hill, County of Carlow". Transactions of the Kilkenny Archaeological Society. 2 (2): 295–303. JSTOR 25489840.
- Graves, James (1854). "Extracts from the Private Memorandum Book of Captain George Gafney, of Kilkenny, an Officer in the Army of James II". Proceedings and Transactions of the Kilkenny and South-East of Ireland Archaeological Society. 3 (1): 161–172. JSTOR 25493651.
- Graves, James (1854). "Notes on the Topography and History of the Parish of Hook, County of Wexford. Part I". Proceedings and Transactions of the Kilkenny and South-East of Ireland Archaeological Society. 3 (1): 194–199. JSTOR 25493654.
- Graves, James (1855). "A List of the Ancient Irish Monumental Stones at Present Existing at Clonmacnoise". Proceedings and Transactions of the Kilkenny and South-East of Ireland Archaeological Society. 3 (2): 293–303. JSTOR 25493664.
- Graves, James (1856). "The Records of the Ancient Borough Towns of the County of Kilkenny". The Journal of the Kilkenny and South-East of Ireland Archaeological Society. New Series. 1 (1): 84–93. JSTOR 25502498.
- Graves, James (1856). "The Surrender, in March, 1649-50, of Ballysonan, in the County of Kildare, to the Parliamentary Forces". The Journal of the Kilkenny and South-East of Ireland Archaeological Society. New Series. 1 (1): 110–117. JSTOR 25502501.
- Graves, James; John G. Augustus Prim (1857). The history, architecture, and antiquities of the cathedral church of St. Canice, Kilkenny. Grafton Street, Dublin: Hodges, Smith, & co.
- Graves, James (1857). "On the Landing-Place of Henry II. In the Harbour of Waterford". The Journal of the Kilkenny and South-East of Ireland Archaeological Society. New Series. 1 (2): 385–388. JSTOR 25502525.
- Graves, James (1858). "Register of Historical Portraits". The Journal of the Kilkenny and South-East of Ireland Archaeological Society. 2 (1): 232–238. JSTOR 25502553.
- Graves, James (1858). "What We Learn from Wilde's "Catalogue of the Antiquities in the Museum of the Royal Irish Academy"". The Journal of the Kilkenny and South-East of Ireland Archaeological Society. New Series. 2 (1): 110–139. JSTOR 25502545.
- Graves, James; Prim, John G. A. (1859). "The History, Architecture, and Antiquities of the City of Kilkenny". The Journal of the Kilkenny and South-East of Ireland Archaeological Society. New Series. 2 (2): 322–331. JSTOR 25502566.
- Graves, James (1861). "The Taking of the Earl of Ormonde, A. D. 1600". The Journal of the Kilkenny and South-East of Ireland Archaeological Society. New Series. 3 (2): 388–432. JSTOR 25502613.
- Graves, James; Prendergast, J. P. (1861). "A Journey to Kilkenny in the Year 1709. From the MS. Notes of Dr. Thomas Molyneux". The Journal of the Kilkenny and South-East of Ireland Archaeological Society. New Series. 3 (2): 296–303. JSTOR 25502606.
- Graves, James (1861). "What We Learn from Wilde's "Catalogue of the Antiquities in the Museum of the Royal Irish Academy"". The Journal of the Kilkenny and South-East of Ireland Archaeological Society. New Series. 3 (2): 247–256. JSTOR 25502603.
- Graves, James (1861). "What We Learn from Wilde's "Catalogue of the Antiquities in the Museum of the Royal Irish Academy"". The Journal of the Kilkenny and South-East of Ireland Archaeological Society. New Series. 3 (2): 266–272. JSTOR 25502605.
- Graves, James (1862). "Register of Historical Portraits (Continued)". The Journal of the Kilkenny and South-East of Ireland Archaeological Society. New Series. 4 (1): 138–140. JSTOR 25502625.
- Graves, James (1863). "Anonymous Account of the Early Life and Marriage of James, First Duke of Ormonde". The Journal of the Kilkenny and South-East of Ireland Archaeological Society. New Series. 4 (2): 276–292. JSTOR 25502636.
- Graves, James (1865). "On a Boulder with Presumed Pagan Carvings at Clonfinlough, King's County". The Journal of the Kilkenny and South-East of Ireland Archaeological Society. New Series. 5 (2): 354–362. JSTOR 25502668.
- Shirley, Evelyn Philip; Dineley, Thomas; O'Brien, Robert; Graves, James; Du Noyer, George V (1865). "Extracts from the Journal of Thomas Dineley, Esquire, Giving Some Account of His Visit to Ireland in the Reign of Charles II". The Journal of the Kilkenny and South-East of Ireland Archaeological Society. New Series. 6 (1): 268–290. JSTOR 25502664.
- Shirley, Evelyn Philip; Dineley, Thomas; O'Brien, Robert; Graves, James (1867). "Extracts from the Journal of Thomas Dineley, Esquire, Giving Some Account of His Visit to Ireland in the Reign of Charles II (Continued)". The Journal of the Kilkenny and South-East of Ireland Archaeological Society. New Series. 6 (1): 73–91, 176–204. JSTOR 25502692.
- Graves, James (1867). "Some Additional Facts as to the Marriage of James, Viscount Thurles, Afterwards Duke of Ormonde, and the Lady Elizabeth Preston". The Journal of the Kilkenny and South-East of Ireland Archaeological Society. New Series. 6 (1): 232–238. JSTOR 25502698.
- Malcolmson, Robert; Graves, James (1868). "Notice of a Book Entitled "Beware the Cat"". The Journal of the Historical and Archaeological Association of Ireland. Third Series. 1 (1): 187–192. JSTOR 25497783.
- Graves, James (1869). "No. 2. The Earls of Desmond". The Journal of the Historical and Archaeological Association of Ireland. Third Series. 1 (2): 459–498. JSTOR 25497799.
- Graves, James (1871). "Unpublished Geraldine Documents (Continued)". The Journal of the Royal Historical and Archaeological Association of Ireland. Fourth Series. 1 (2): 591–616. JSTOR 25506599.
- Graves, James (1873). "Notes on an Autograph of the Fair Geraldine". The Journal of the Royal Historical and Archaeological Association of Ireland. Fourth Series. 2 (2): 561–570. JSTOR 25506636.
- Graves, James (1874). "The Church and Shrine of St. Manchán". The Journal of the Royal Historical and Archaeological Association of Ireland. Fourth Series. 3 (18): 134–150. JSTOR 25506649.
- Graves, James; Fitz Gibbon, Abraham (1876). "Unpublished Geraldine Documents (Continued)". The Journal of the Royal Historical and Archaeological Association of Ireland. Fourth Series. 4 (25): 14–52. JSTOR 25506693.
- Graves, James (1877). "On Cup and Circle Sculptures as Occurring in Ireland". The Journal of the Royal Historical and Archaeological Association of Ireland. Fourth Series. 4 (30): 283–296. JSTOR 25506718.
- Graves, James (1878). "Bronze Shields". The Journal of the Royal Historical and Archaeological Association of Ireland. Fourth Series. 4 (35): 487–488. JSTOR 25506732.
- Graves, James (1884). "Excursion to Emania, Tynan and Its Crosses, and Caledon Hill Demesne". The Journal of the Royal Historical and Archaeological Association of Ireland. 6 (59): 409–422, 424–431. JSTOR 25506907.

=== Works published anonymously ===
There are several occurrences in the Transactions that bear no author's name, but where James Graves was instrumental in the research and might be the author.

- "Ancient Irish Water-Mills". Transactions of the Kilkenny Archaeological Society. 1 (2): 154–164. 1850. JSTOR 25554917.

=== Sketchbooks/ notebooks ===
These have only partly been published and are held by the Royal Society of Antiquaries of Ireland.

- RSAI G1, dates 1837-1842 with sketches from Dublin, Lancashire, Co. Kilkenny and Co. Laois
- RSAI G2, dates 1840-1848 containing sketches of landscapes, ruins, medieval buildings
- RSAI G3, notebook dating to 1844; contains sketches of heraldic motifs amongst other things
- RSAI G4, notebook dating to the 1850s containing architectural observations amongst other things

== Notes and references ==
=== Primary sources ===
- Wynne Foot, Arthur (1889). "A memoriam paper on James Graves, Secretary and Treasurer of the Royal Historical and Archaeological Association of Ireland, formerly the Kilkenny Archeological Society" (PDF). The Journal of the Royal Society of Antiquaries of Ireland. Fourth Series. VIII (1887-1888 ed.): 8–23.
