= List of townlands of County Leitrim =

This is a sortable table of the approximately 1,508 townlands in County Leitrim, Ireland.

Duplicate names occur where there is more than one townland with the same name in the county. Names marked in bold typeface are towns and villages, and the word Town appears for those entries in the Acres column.

== Townland list ==
Townland	Acres	Barony	Civil parish	Poor law union
Acres	37	Leitrim	Kiltoghert	Carrick on Shannon
Acres	58	Drumahaire	Inishmagrath	Manorhamilton
Acres	56	Carrigallen	Cloone	Mohill
Acres	85	Mohill	Mohill	Mohill
Adereen	56	Leitrim	Kiltoghert	Carrick on Shannon
Adoon	699	Mohill	Cloone	Mohill
Aghaas	343	Carrigallen	Cloone	Mohill
Aghaboneill	321	Mohill	Fenagh	Mohill
Aghacashel	450	Leitrim	Kiltubbrid	Carrick on Shannon
Aghacashlaun	135	Leitrim	Kiltubbrid	Carrick on Shannon
Aghadark **Achadh Dearc**	135	Carrigallen	Oughteragh	Bawnboy
Aghaderrard East	361	Rosclogher	Rossinver	Ballyshannon
Aghaderrard West	217	Rosclogher	Rossinver	Ballyshannon
Aghadrumcarn	257	Mohill	Mohill	Mohill
Aghadrumderg	45	Mohill	Mohill	Mohill
Aghadrumginshin	275	Carrigallen	Cloone	Mohill
Aghadunvane	671	Rosclogher	Rossinver	Ballyshannon
Aghaginny	374	Leitrim	Kiltubbrid	Carrick on Shannon
Aghagrania	578	Leitrim	Kiltoghert	Carrick on Shannon
Aghakilbrack	360	Leitrim	Kiltubbrid	Carrick on Shannon
Aghakilconnell	112	Leitrim	Kiltoghert	Carrick on Shannon
Aghakilfaughna	36	Mohill	Mohill	Mohill
Aghakilmore	137	Leitrim	Kiltubbrid	Carrick on Shannon
Aghalateeve	1,061	Rosclogher	Rossinver	Ballyshannon
Aghaleague	170	Carrigallen	Carrigallen	Bawnboy
Aghaleague	125	Carrigallen	Oughteragh	Bawnboy
Aghalough	289	Carrigallen	Drumreilly	Bawnboy
Aghalough	427	Carrigallen	Cloone	Mohill
Aghameelta	157	Drumahaire	Drumlease	Manorhamilton
Aghameelta Barr	245	Drumahaire	Drumlease	Manorhamilton
Aghameeny	40	Leitrim	Kiltoghert	Carrick on Shannon
Aghamore	179	Rosclogher	Rossinver	Ballyshannon
Aghamore	93	Drumahaire	Inishmagrath	Manorhamilton
Aghamore	222	Rosclogher	Killasnet	Manorhamilton
Aghamore	143	Mohill	Annaduff	Mohill
Aghamore	281	Mohill	Clone	Mohill
Aghamore	184	Mohill	Mohill	Mohill
Aghancarra	46	Leitrim	Kiltoghert	Carrick on Shannon
Aghanlish	982	Rosclogher	Rossinver	Ballyshannon
Agharann	735	Carrigallen	Cloone	Mohill
Agharoosky	346	Rosclogher	Rossinver	Ballyshannon
Agharroo	398	Rosclogher	Rossinver	Ballyshannon
Aghatawny Lower	101	Carrigallen	Oughteragh	Bawnboy
Aghatawny Upper	66	Carrigallen	Oughteragh	Bawnboy
Aghavadden	213	Leitrim	Fenagh	Mohill
Aghavanny	491	Rosclogher	Cloonclare	Manorhamilton
Aghavilla	330	Carrigallen	Carrigallen	Mohill
Aghavoghil	1,799	Rosclogher	Rossinver	Ballyshannon
Aghavore	584	Carrigallen	Carrigallen	Mohill
Aghawillin	83	Carrigallen	Drumreilly	Bawnboy
Aghawillin	413	Carrigallen	Carrigallen	Mohill
Aghintass	138	Mohill	Annaduff	Mohill
Aghinteeduff	38	Mohill	Mohill	Mohill
Aghintober	36	Leitrim	Annaduff	Carrick on Shannon
Aghlacon	137	Drumahaire	Cloonclare	Manorhamilton
Aghlin	237	Carrigallen	Oughteragh	Bawnboy
Aghnacross	28	Mohill	Mohill	Mohill
Aghnagollop	250	Leitrim	Kiltoghert	Carrick on Shannon
Aghnahaha	890	Rosclogher	Rossinver	Manorhamilton
Aghnahoo	142	Leitrim	Kiltubbrid	Carrick on Shannon
Aghnahoo	391	Rosclogher	Rossinver	Manorhamilton
Aghnahunshin	111	Mohill	Mohill	Mohill
Aghnamona	207	Mohill	Mohill	Mohill
Aghoo	92	Carrigallen	Drumreilly	Bawnboy
Aghoo East	247	Carrigallen	Oughteragh	Bawnboy
Aghoo West	46	Carrigallen	Oughteragh	Bawnboy
Aghyowla	112	Carrigallen	Oughteragh	Bawnboy
Altakeeran	806	Carrigallen	Oughteragh	Bawnboy
Altavra	686	Drumahaire	Killarga	Manorhamilton
Alteen	241	Drumahaire	Inishmagrath	Manorhamilton
Alteenacres Glebe	38	Drumahaire	Inishmagrath	Manorhamilton
Altiquin	95	Drumahaire	Inishmagrath	Manorhamilton
Amorset	119	Rosclogher	Killasnet	Manorhamilton
Annaduff	268	Leitrim	Annaduff	Carrick on Shannon
Annaduff Glebe	482	Leitrim	Annaduff	Carrick on Shannon
Annagh	132	Carrigallen	Carrigallen	Bawnboy
Annagh	118	Leitrim	Kiltubbrid	Carrick on Shannon
Annagh	286	Drumahaire	Cloonclare	Manorhamilton
Annagh	153	Drumahaire	Killarga	Manorhamilton
Annagh Lower	176	Drumahaire	Drumreilly	Carrick on Shannon
Annagh Upper	167	Drumahaire	Drumreilly	Carrick on Shannon
Annaghaderg	254	Mohill	Fenagh	Mohill
Annaghasna	250	Leitrim	Kiltoghert	Carrick on Shannon
Annaghboy	138	Drumahaire	Killarga	Manorhamilton
Annaghbradican	243	Leitrim	Kiltoghert	Carrick on Shannon
Annaghderg Lower	103	Mohill	Mohill	Mohill
Annaghderg Upper	89	Mohill	Mohill	Mohill
Annaghearly	268	Leitrim	Kiltoghert	Carrick on Shannon
Annaghgerry	111	Drumahaire	Inishmagrath	Manorhamilton
Annaghkeenty	166	Leitrim	Kiltoghert	Carrick on Shannon
Annaghkeenty	72	Leitrim	Kiltubbrid	Carrick on Shannon
Annaghmaconway	258	Mohill	Cloone	Mohill
Annaghmacullen	408	Mohill	Cloone	Mohill
Annaghmore	499	Mohill	Cloone	Mohill
Annaghnamaddoo	203	Leitrim	Kiltoghert	Carrick on Shannon
Annaghoney	131	Mohill	Cloone	Mohill
Annaghselherny	206	Leitrim	Kiltoghert	Carrick on Shannon
Anskert	339	Mohill	Cloone	Mohill
Antfield	107	Mohill	Annaduff	Mohill
Ardagh	137	Leitrim	Fenagh	Mohill
Ardagh (Gilbride)	165	Rosclogher	Rossinver	Ballyshannon
Ardagh (Sheeran)	190	Rosclogher	Rossinver	Ballyshannon
Ardakip Beg	101	Drumahaire	Killanummery	Manorhamilton
Ardakip More	199	Drumahaire	Killanummery	Manorhamilton
Ardcolum	49	Leitrim	Kiltoghert	Carrick on Shannon
Arderry	236	Carrigallen	Drumreilly	Bawnboy
Ardlougher	140	Leitrim	Kiltoghert	Carrick on Shannon
Ardlougher	125	Drumahaire	Inishmagrath	Manorhamilton
Ardmeenan	212	Carrigallen	Oughteragh	Bawnboy
Ardmoneen	364	Drumahaire	Cloonclare	Manorhamilton
Ardrum	419	Carrigallen	Oughteragh	Bawnboy
Ardunsaghan	433	Carrigallen	Drumreilly	Bawnboy
Ardvarney	823	Drumahaire	Cloonclare	Manorhamilton
Ardvarney	169	Drumahaire	Killanummery	Manorhamilton
Aroddy	235	Leitrim	Fenagh	Mohill
Arroo	371	Rosclogher	Rossinver	Ballyshannon
Askill	496	Rosclogher	Rossinver	Ballyshannon
Attifinlay	78	Leitrim	Kiltoghert	Carrick on Shannon
Attimanus	287	Leitrim	Mohill	Mohill
Attirory	245	Leitrim	Kiltoghert	Carrick on Shannon
Aughrim	879	Drumahaire	Drumreilly	Carrick on Shannon
Aughrim	70	Leitrim	Kiltubbrid	Carrick on Shannon
Aughrim	125	Drumahaire	Inishmagrath	Manorhamilton
Aughriman	174	Leitrim	Kiltoghert	Carrick on Shannon
Aughriman South	292	Leitrim	Kiltoghert	Carrick on Shannon
Aughry	126	Mohill	Annaduff	Mohill
Ballaghnabehy	407	Drumahaire	Cloonclare	Manorhamilton
**Ballinamore**	Town	Carrigallen	Oughteragh	Bawnboy
Ballinwing	279	Leitrim	Kiltoghert	Carrick on Shannon
Ballycalleen	149	Leitrim	Fenagh	Mohill
Ballyglass	301	Rosclogher	Killasnet	Manorhamilton
Ballymore	158	Rosclogher	Rossinver	Ballyshannon
Ballynaboll	351	Drumahaire	Drumlease	Manorhamilton
Ballynacleigh	158	Leitrim	Kiltoghert	Carrick on Shannon
Ballynameeltoge	305	Carrigallen	Oughteragh	Bawnboy
Ballynamony	74	Carrigallen	Carrigallen	Bawnboy
Ballynamony	99	Leitrim	Kiltoghert	Carrick on Suir
Banagher	416	Drumahaire	Drumlease	Manorhamilton
Bargowla	288	Drumahaire	Inishmagrath	Manorhamilton
Barlear	600	Drumahaire	Killarga	Manorhamilton
Barnameenagh	1,492	Leitrim	Kiltoghert	Carrick on Shannon
Barnameenagh West	349	Leitrim	Kiltoghert	Carrick on Suir
Barr of Farrow	844	Drumahaire	Cloonclare	Manorhamilton
Barr of Shancurragh	53	Rosclogher	Killasnet	Manorhamilton
Barracashlaun	287	Rosclogher	Killasnet	Manorhamilton
Barrackpark	30	Rosclogher	Killasnet	Manorhamilton
Barragh Beg	60	Drumahaire	Inishmagrath	Manorhamilton
Barragh More	144	Drumahaire	Inishmagrath	Manorhamilton
Barrs East	436	Drumahaire	Cloonclare	Manorhamilton
Barrs West	397	Drumahaire	Cloonclare	Manorhamilton
Bawn	145	Drumahaire	Killanummery	Manorhamilton
Beagh	725	Drumahaire	Killanummery	Manorhamilton
Beagh Beg	265	Carrigallen	Carrigallen	Mohill
Beagh More	545	Carrigallen	Carrigallen	Mohill
Beihy	1,016	Mohill	Cloone	Mohill
Belhavel	111	Drumahaire	Killarga	Manorhamilton
Bellagart	87	Leitrim	Kiltoghert	Carrick on Shannon
Bellageeher	445	Mohill	Mohill	Mohill
Bellakiltyfea	696	Mohill	Cloone	Mohill
Bellanaboy	276	Leitrim	Kiltoghert	Carrick on Shannon
Bilberry Island	2	Drumahaire	Cloonclare	Manorhamilton
Blackgardens	122	Drumahaire	Killarga	Manorhamilton
Blackmountain	347	Drumahaire	Cloonclare	Manorhamilton
Blackrock	233	Leitrim	Kiltoghert	Carrick on Shannon
Bleankillew (or Furnace)	177	Mohill	Annaduff	Mohill
Boeeshil	203	Carrigallen	Drumreilly	Bawnboy
Boeeshil	80	Mohill	Mohill	Mohill
Boggaun	108	Carrigallen	Oughteragh	Bawnboy
Boggaun	984	Drumahaire	Cloonlogher	Manorhamilton
Boihy	885	Drumahaire	Drumlease	Manorhamilton
Boleybaun	193	Drumahaire	Inishmagrath	Manorhamilton
Boleyboy	1,634	Rosclogher	Cloonclare	Manorhamilton
Boleybrack	221	Drumahaire	Killarga	Manorhamilton
Boleymaguire	858	Drumahaire	Inishmagrath	Manorhamilton
Bolganard	74	Carrigallen	Oughteragh	Bawnboy
Bomahas	58	Rosclogher	Rossinver	Ballyshannon
Boneill	150	Mohill	Fenagh	Mohill
Boyannagh	465	Rosclogher	Rossinver	Ballyshannon
Brackary Beg	302	Rosclogher	Killasnet	Manorhamilton
Brackary More	314	Rosclogher	Killasnet	Manorhamilton
Branra	60	Leitrim	Fenagh	Mohill
Braudphark	236	Drumahaire	Inishmagrath	Manorhamilton
Breandrum (King)	99	Mohill	Mohill	Mohill
Breandrum (Peyton)	173	Mohill	Mohill	Mohill
Breanross	125	Mohill	Mohill	Mohill
Breanross North	244	Mohill	Cloone	Mohill
Breanross South	299	Mohill	Cloone	Mohill
Bredagh	230	Carrigallen	Carrigallen	Mohill
Briscloonagh	460	Drumahaire	Cloonclare	Manorhamilton
Brockagh	28	Drumahaire	Killarga	Manorhamilton
Brockagh Lower	243	Drumahaire	Cloonclare	Manorhamilton
Brockagh Upper	250	Drumahaire	Cloonclare	Manorhamilton
Bronagh	590	Drumahaire	Cloonclare	Manorhamilton
Brownhill and Cullen	212	Carrigallen	Carrigallen	Bawnboy
Buckhill Barr	193	Drumahaire	Cloonlogher	Manorhamilton
Buckode	333	Rosclogher	Rossinver	Ballyshannon
Bundarragh	176	Carrigallen	Cloone	Mohill
Bundiveen	38	Drumahaire	Inishmagrath	Manorhamilton
Bunduff	47	Rosclogher	Rossinver	Ballyshannon
Bunkilleen	89	Mohill	Mohill	Mohill
Bunny Beg	254	Leitrim	Mohill	Mohill
Bunny More Lower	51	Leitrim	Mohill	Mohill
Bunny More Upper	95	Leitrim	Mohill	Mohill
Bunrevagh	318	Leitrim	Kiltubbrid	Carrick on Shannon
Caddagh Glebe	216	Drumahaire	Killanummery	Manorhamilton
Caldragh	92	Leitrim	Kiltoghert	Carrick on Shannon
Calloughs	260	Carrigallen	Carrigallen	Mohill
Callowhill	309	Carrigallen	Oughteragh	Bawnboy
Camagh	303	Carrigallen	Oughteragh	Bawnboy
Camalt	57	Drumahaire	Inishmagrath	Manorhamilton
Camderry	786	Drumahaire	Cloonclare	Manorhamilton
Canbeg	171	Drumahaire	Inishmagrath	Manorhamilton
Cankeel	39	Leitrim	Annaduff	Mohill
Cannaboe	129	Carrigallen	Oughteragh	Bawnboy
Cappagh	103	Mohill	Mohill	Mohill
Carntullagh	616	Drumahaire	Drumreilly	Carrick on Shannon
Carraun	283	Rosclogher	Cloonclare	Manorhamilton
Carrick	292	Leitrim	Annaduff	Carrick on Shannon
Carrick	108	Leitrim	Kiltubbrid	Carrick on Shannon
Carrick	82	Mohill	Mohill	Mohill
**Carrick on Shannon (part)**	Town	Leitrim	Kiltoghert	Carrick on Shannon
Carrickacroghery	172	Drumahaire	Drumlease	Manorhamilton
Carrickanurroo	190	Drumahaire	Drumlease	Manorhamilton
Carrickaport	148	Leitrim	Kiltubbrid	Carrick on Shannon
Carrickateane	99	Carrigallen	Carrigallen	Bawnboy
Carrickaveril	21	Leitrim	Kiltoghert	Carrick on Shannon
Carrickavoher	476	Carrigallen	Cloone	Mohill
Carrickbaun	123	Leitrim	Kiltoghert	Carrick on Shannon
Carrickeeny	773	Rosclogher	Killasnet	Manorhamilton
Carrickevy	58	Leitrim	Kiltoghert	Carrick on Shannon
Carrickfad	425	Drumahaire	Drumlease	Manorhamilton
Carrickgooan	258	Rosclogher	Killasnet	Manorhamilton
Carrickleitrim	307	Drumahaire	Cloonclare	Manorhamilton
Carrickmakeegan	349	Carrigallen	Drumreilly	Bawnboy
Carrickmurray	55	Drumahaire	Killarga	Manorhamilton
Carricknabrack	80	Leitrim	Kiltoghert	Carrick on Shannon
Carrickoghil	72	Drumahaire	Killarga	Manorhamilton
Carrickrevagh	535	Drumahaire	Cloonclare	Manorhamilton
Carrickslavan	124	Leitrim	Kiltoghert	Carrick on Shannon
**Carrigallen**	Town	Carrigallen	Carrigallen	Mohill
Carrigeen	203	Drumahaire	Killanummery	Manorhamilton
Carrigeen	203	Mohill	Mohill	Mohill
Carrigeencor	900	Drumahaire	Drumlease	Manorhamilton
Carrigeengeare	97	Rosclogher	Cloonclare	Manorhamilton
Carrowboy	142	Rosclogher	Rossinver	Ballyshannon
Carrowcrin	235	Drumahaire	Killanummery	Manorhamilton
Carrowduff	155	Rosclogher	Rossinver	Ballyshannon
Carrowkeel	128	Rosclogher	Rossinver	Manorhamilton
Carrowlaur	103	Drumahaire	Inishmagrath	Manorhamilton
Carrownoona	423	Rosclogher	Rossinver	Ballyshannon
Carrowrevagh	368	Rosclogher	Rossinver	Manorhamilton
Cartown	93	Leitrim	Kiltoghert	Carrick on Shannon
Cartron	145	Drumahaire	Drumlease	Manorhamilton
Cartron	83	Leitrim	Mohill	Mohill
Cartronatemple	188	Rosclogher	Killasnet	Manorhamilton
Cartronbeg	43	Drumahaire	Inishmagrath	Manorhamilton
Cartrongibbagh	348	Rosclogher	Rossinver	Manorhamilton
Cashel	222	Drumahaire	Killanummery	Manorhamilton
Cashel	350	Mohill	Mohill	Mohill
Cashelaveela	287	Rosclogher	Cloonclare	Manorhamilton
Castlerogy	150	Carrigallen	Oughteragh	Bawnboy
Castletown	67	Rosclogher	Killasnet	Manorhamilton
Cattan	1,187	Mohill	Cloone	Mohill
Cavan	148	Drumahaire	Inishmagrath	Manorhamilton
Cavan	143	Mohill	Mohill	Mohill
Cherry Island	3	Carrigallen	Carrigallen	Bawnboy
Cherrybrook	135	Rosclogher	Cloonclare	Manorhamilton
Church Island	10	Carrigallen	Carrigallen	Bawnboy
Churchfield	6	Leitrim	Fenagh	Mohill
Clarashinnagh	118	Mohill	Mohill	Mohill
Cleen	266	Drumahaire	Killanummery	Manorhamilton
Cleenaghoo	196	Carrigallen	Oughteragh	Bawnboy
Cleendargan	211	Carrigallen	Oughteragh	Bawnboy
Cleggan	34	Drumahaire	Cloonclare	Manorhamilton
Cleighragh	560	Rosclogher	Rossinver	Ballyshannon
Cleighran	246	Drumahaire	Killanummery	Manorhamilton
Cleighran Beg	354	Drumahaire	Drumreilly	Carrick on Shannon
Cleighran More	368	Drumahaire	Drumreilly	Carrick on Shannon
Cloghan	179	Rosclogher	Rossinver	Ballyshannon
Clogher	299	Carrigallen	Oughteragh	Bawnboy
Clogher	126	Leitrim	Kiltoghert	Carrick on Shannon
Cloghlough	228	Carrigallen	Carrigallen	Mohill
Cloghmeen	652	Rosclogher	Killasnet	Manorhamilton
Cloodrevagh	27	Rosclogher	Rossinver	Ballyshannon
Cloodrumman Berg	91	Leitrim	Fenagh	Mohill
Cloodrumman More	108	Leitrim	Fenagh	Mohill
Cloonagh	127	Drumahaire	Killarga	Manorhamilton
Cloonaghmore	534	Drumahaire	Cloonclare	Manorhamilton
Cloonamurgal	128	Drumahaire	Inishmagrath	Manorhamilton
Cloonaquin	1,044	Drumahaire	Cloonlogher	Manorhamilton
Cloonawillin	138	Rosclogher	Rossinver	Ballyshannon
Cloonbannive	415	Drumahaire	Killanummery	Manorhamilton
Cloonbo	156	Mohill	Mohill	Mohill
Cloonboniagh North	165	Mohill	Mohill	Mohill
Cloonboniagh South	471	Mohill	Mohill	Mohill
Cloonboygher	398	Carrigallen	Carrigallen	Bawnboy
Clooncabir	381	Mohill	Mohill	Mohill
Clooncarreen	835	Mohill	Mohill	Mohill
Cloonclare	11	Drumahaire	Cloonclare	Manorhamilton
Cloonclivvy	241	Mohill	Mohill	Mohill
Clooncoe	672	Mohill	Cloone	Mohill
Clooncolry	450	Mohill	Mohill	Mohill
Clooncorick	372	Carrigallen	Carrigallen	Mohill
Clooncose	341	Carrigallen	Carrigallen	Bawnboy
Clooncose	406	Mohill	Cloone	Mohill
Clooncumber	442	Mohill	Cloone	Mohill
**Cloone**	Town	Mohill	Cloone	Mohill
Cloone	331	Rosclogher	Rossinver	Ballyshannon
Cloone	391	Mohill	Cloone	Mohill
Clooneagh	360	Mohill	Mohill	Mohill
Cloonee	244	Mohill	Cloone	Mohill
Clooneen	163	Drumahaire	Inishmagrath	Manorhamilton
Clooneen	229	Rosclogher	Killasnet	Manorhamilton
Clooney	199	Leitrim	Kiltubbrid	Carrick on Shannon
Cloonfeacle	60	Leitrim	Kiltoghert	Carrick on Shannon
Cloonfinnan	226	Mohill	Mohill	Mohill
Cloonlaughil	559	Mohill	Cloone	Mohill
Cloonlaughil	125	Mohill	Mohill	Mohill
Cloonlogher	457	Drumahaire	Cloonlogher	Manorhamilton
Cloonmeone Lower	123	Drumahaire	Inishmagrath	Manorhamilton
Cloonmeone Upper	89	Drumahaire	Inishmagrath	Manorhamilton
Cloonmorris	430	Mohill	Mohill	Mohill
Cloonmulligan	71	Leitrim	Kiltoghert	Carrick on Shannon
Cloonsheebane	74	Leitrim	Kiltoghert	Carrick on Shannon
Cloonsheerevagh	54	Leitrim	Kiltoghert	Carrick on Shannon
Cloontubbrid	337	Mohill	Cloone	Mohill
Cloontumpher	174	Mohill	Mohill	Mohill
Cloonturk	350	Mohill	Mohill	Mohill
Cloonty	579	Rosclogher	Rossinver	Ballyshannon
Cloontyprughlish	681	Rosclogher	Rossinver	Ballyshannon
Cloverhill (or Corglass)	97	Carrigallen	Oughteragh	Bawnboy
Coldrumman	86	Leitrim	Fenagh	Mohill
Commons	95	Leitrim	Fenagh	Mohill
Conaghil	296	Drumahaire	Drumlease	Manorhamilton
Conray	340	Drumahaire	Drumlease	Manorhamilton
Conray	357	Rosclogher	Rossinver	Manorhamilton
Conwal North	525	Rosclogher	Rossinver	Manorhamilton
Conwal South	292	Rosclogher	Rossinver	Manorhamilton
Coolabaun	143	Mohill	Mohill	Mohill
Coolcreeve	70	Leitrim	Annaduff	Carrick on Shannon
Coollegreane	654	Drumahaire	Inishmagrath	Manorhamilton
Coolodonnell	435	Rosclogher	Rossinver	Manorhamilton
Coragh	212	Carrigallen	Drumreilly	Bawnboy
Coranagh	208	Carrigallen	Carrigallen	Mohill
Coraughrim	120	Leitrim	Kiltoghert	Carrick on Shannon
Corbally	72	Leitrim	Kiltoghert	Carrick on Shannon
Corbeg	79	Rosclogher	Rossinver	Ballyshannon
Corboghil	169	Leitrim	Mohill	Mohill
Corchuill Lower	111	Drumahaire	Inishmagrath	Manorhamilton
Corchuill Upper	53	Drumahaire	Inishmagrath	Manorhamilton
Corcormick	157	Drumahaire	Inishmagrath	Manorhamilton
Corcusconny	376	Drumahaire	Killanummery	Manorhamilton
Corderry	130	Drumahaire	Inishmagrath	Manorhamilton
Corderry	208	Drumahaire	Killarga	Manorhamilton
Corderry (Morton)	178	Leitrim	Kiltubbrid	Carrick on Shannon
Corderry (Peyton)	370	Leitrim	Kiltubbrid	Carrick on Shannon
Cordiver	273	Rosclogher	Rossinver	Ballyshannon
Corduff	52	Carrigallen	Drumreilly	Bawnboy
Corduff	91	Drumahaire	Inishmagrath	Manorhamilton
Corduff	234	Mohill	Annaduff	Mohill
Corduff	94	Mohill	Mohill	Mohill
Corduff North	250	Carrigallen	Cloone	Mohill
Corduff South	428	Mohill	Cloone	Mohill
Corduffhill	23	Mohill	Mohill	Mohill
Corgallion	51	Mohill	Mohill	Mohill
Corgar	159	Carrigallen	Oughteragh	Bawnboy
Corgar	79	Mohill	Mohill	Mohill
Corglancey	517	Drumahaire	Killanummery	Manorhamilton
Corglass	423	Carrigallen	Carrigallen	Bawnboy
Corglass	141	Drumahaire	Drumreilly	Carrick on Shannon
Corglass	134	Leitrim	Kiltubbrid	Carrick on Shannon
Corglass	36	Drumahaire	Inishmagrath	Manorhamilton
Corglass	1,034	Rosclogher	Killasnet	Manorhamilton
Corglass (or Cloverhill)	97	Carrigallen	Oughteragh	Bawnboy
Corgloghan	90	Carrigallen	Drumreilly	Bawnboy
Corhawnagh	68	Leitrim	Kiltoghert	Carrick on Shannon
Corlaskagh	116	Leitrim	Mohill	Carrick on Shannon
Corlea	148	Leitrim	Mohill	Carrick on Shannon
Corlea	614	Rosclogher	Rossinver	Manorhamilton
Corlisheen	159	Leitrim	Annaduff	Carrick on Shannon
Corlona	79	Leitrim	Kiltoghert	Carrick on Shannon
Corlough	147	Leitrim	Kiltoghert	Carrick on Shannon
Corlough	221	Leitrim	Fenagh	Mohill
Corloughcahill	175	Drumahaire	Inishmagrath	Manorhamilton
Corloughtomalty	41	Drumahaire	Inishmagrath	Manorhamilton
Corlouglin	91	Leitrim	Kiltoghert	Carrick on Shannon
Cormeeltan	78	Leitrim	Kiltoghert	Carrick on Shannon
Cormongan	197	Leitrim	Kiltoghert	Carrick on Shannon
Cormore	78	Mohill	Mohill	Mohill
Cornabroher	120	Carrigallen	Oughteragh	Bawnboy
Cornabrone	207	Leitrim	Fenagh	Mohill
Cornacloy	239	Drumahaire	Cloonclare	Manorhamilton
Cornacloy	81	Drumahaire	Inishmagrath	Manorhamilton
Cornacorroo	109	Leitrim	Kiltoghert	Carrick on Shannon
Cornacranghy	111	Leitrim	Kiltoghert	Carrick on Shannon
Cornacreegh	126	Carrigallen	Oughteragh	Bawnboy
Cornacreeve	47	Carrigallen	Drumreilly	Bawnboy
Cornacreeve	71	Carrigallen	Oughteragh	Bawnboy
Cornaferst	323	Carrigallen	Carrigallen	Mohill
Cornafostra	82	Leitrim	Fenagh	Mohill
Cornagawna	258	Rosclogher	Rossinver	Ballyshannon
Cornageeha	272	Rosclogher	Rossinver	Ballyshannon
Cornageeha	128	Drumahaire	Drumreilly	Carrick on Shannon
Cornageeha	304	Mohill	Cloone	Mohill
Cornageeha	74	Leitrim	Mohill	Mohill
Cornageeragh	146	Carrigallen	Oughteragh	Bawnboy
Cornagher	567	Mohill	Cloone	Mohill
Cornaghy	182	Carrigallen	Carrigallen	Mohill
Cornagillagh	90	Leitrim	Annaduff	Carrick on Shannon
Cornagillagh	618	Rosclogher	Killasnet	Manorhamilton
Cornagillagh	287	Mohill	Mohill	Mohill
Cornaglah	242	Rosclogher	Rossinver	Ballyshannon
Cornagon	108	Mohill	Fenagh	Mohill
Cornagresha North	70	Mohill	Mohill	Mohill
Cornagresha South	69	Mohill	Mohill	Mohill
Cornaguillagh	121	Drumahaire	Drumreilly	Carrick on Shannon
Cornalaghta	582	Drumahaire	Drumlease	Manorhamilton
Cornaleck	88	Leitrim	Kiltubbrid	Carrick on Shannon
Cornaman	129	Drumahaire	Cloonclare	Manorhamilton
Cornamarve	159	Drumahaire	Killarga	Manorhamilton
Cornamucklagh	68	Leitrim	Kiltoghert	Carrick on Shannon
Cornamucklagh	213	Carrigallen	Cloone	Mohill
Cornamucklagh North	266	Drumahaire	Drumreilly	Carrick on Shannon
Cornamucklagh South	640	Drumahaire	Drumreilly	Carrick on Shannon
Cornamuddagh	96	Leitrim	Kiltoghert	Carrick on Shannon
Cornaneane	144	Rosclogher	Killasnet	Manorhamilton
Cornanvad	210	Mohill	Fenagh	Mohill
Cornaroy	394	Leitrim	Kiltoghert	Carrick on Shannon
Cornashamsoge	574	Leitrim	Kiltoghert	Carrick on Shannon
Cornaslieve	36	Leitrim	Kiltoghert	Carrick on Shannon
Cornastauk	460	Drumahaire	Cloonclare	Manorhamilton
Cornavannoge	77	Drumahaire	Cloonclare	Manorhamilton
Cornee	231	Mohill	Mohill	Mohill
Cornulla	410	Mohill	Cloone	Mohill
Corrabarrack	266	Mohill	Fenagh	Mohill
Corrabeagh	190	Leitrim	Fenagh	Mohill
Corracaboon	33	Mohill	Mohill	Mohill
Corracar	97	Carrigallen	Carrigallen	Bawnboy
Corrachole	93	Carrigallen	Oughteragh	Bawnboy
Corrachoosaun	206	Leitrim	Fenagh	Mohill
Corrachuill	92	Leitrim	Kiltoghert	Carrick on Shannon
Corracloona	741	Rosclogher	Cloonclare	Manorhamilton
Corracramph North	44	Leitrim	Mohill	Carrick on Shannon
Corracramph South	413	Mohill	Mohill	Carrick on Shannon
Corracreeny	93	Carrigallen	Carrigallen	Mohill
Corragoly	30	Mohill	Fenagh	Mohill
Corrala	232	Carrigallen	Drumreilly	Bawnboy
Corralahan	36	Carrigallen	Drumreilly	Bawnboy
Corraleehan	152	Rosclogher	Rossinver	Manorhamilton
Corraleskin	314	Rosclogher	Rossinver	Manorhamilton
Corralustia	156	Drumahaire	Inishmagrath	Manorhamilton
Corramahan	279	Carrigallen	Drumreilly	Bawnboy
Corramartin	56	Carrigallen	Oughteragh	Bawnboy
Corraneary	594	Carrigallen	Cloone	Mohill
Corraphort	153	Leitrim	Fenagh	Mohill
Corrascoffy	183	Mohill	Mohill	Mohill
Corrasmaghooil	54	Leitrim	Kiltubbrid	Carrick on Shannon
Corrasra	243	Drumahaire	Killarga	Manorhamilton
Corratawy	168	Drumahaire	Killarga	Manorhamilton
Corraterriff North	28	Mohill	Mohill	Mohill
Corraterriff South	80	Mohill	Mohill	Mohill
Corratimore Glebe	583	Drumahaire	Killanummery	Manorhamilton
Corrawaleen	358	Carrigallen	Drumreilly	Bawnboy
Corraweehil Glebe	153	Drumahaire	Inishmagrath	Manorhamilton
Correen	193	Leitrim	Kiltoghert	Carrick on Shannon
Correish	125	Leitrim	Annaduff	Mohill
Corriga	545	Carrigallen	Cloone	Mohill
Corrudda	215	Drumahaire	Drumlease	Manorhamilton
Corry	264	Drumahaire	Inishmagrath	Manorhamilton
Corry Island	4	Drumahaire	Inishmagrath	Manorhamilton
Corry Mountain (or Seltannasaggart)	131	Drumahaire	Inishmagrath	Manorhamilton
Corryard	55	Leitrim	Kiltoghert	Carrick on Shannon
Corrycullen	159	Drumahaire	Drumlease	Manorhamilton
Corryolus	157	Leitrim	Kiltoghert	Carrick on Shannon
Cortober	558	Drumahaire	Drumreilly	Carrick on Shannon
Costrea	221	Leitrim	Fenagh	Mohill
Crane Island	1	Carrigallen	Carrigallen	Bawnboy
Crannoge Island	1	Drumahaire	Cloonclare	Manorhamilton
Creenagh	137	Leitrim	Kiltoghert	Carrick on Shannon
Creenagh	343	Mohill	Cloone	Mohill
Creevaghern Island	1	Drumahaire	Cloonclare	Manorhamilton
Creevelea	206	Rosclogher	Rossinver	Ballyshannon
Creevelea	57	Drumahaire	Killanummery	Manorhamilton
Creevy	290	Carrigallen	Oughteragh	Bawnboy
Crey	83	Leitrim	Kiltoghert	Carrick on Shannon
Crickeen	38	Leitrim	Annaduff	Carrick on Shannon
Crockawaddy	161	Carrigallen	Drumreilly	Bawnboy
Crockeen	141	Carrigallen	Drumreilly	Bawnboy
Cromlin	158	Carrigallen	Oughteragh	Bawnboy
Crossdrumman	114	Mohill	Mohill	Mohill
Crummy	252	Leitrim	Kiltubbrid	Carrick on Shannon
Crumpaun	282	Rosclogher	Rossinver	Ballyshannon
Cuillagh	215	Leitrim	Fenagh	Mohill
Cuilmore	302	Carrigallen	Drumreilly	Bawnboy
Cuilmore	97	Mohill	Annaduff	Mohill
Cuiltia	85	Drumahaire	Drumreilly	Carrick on Shannon
Cuilties	47	Drumahaire	Cloonclare	Manorhamilton
Cullen and Brownhill	212	Carrigallen	Carrigallen	Bawnboy
Cullentragh	375	Drumahaire	Cloonclare	Manorhamilton
Cullies	270	Carrigallen	Carrigallen	Mohill
Cullionboy	435	Rosclogher	Killasnet	Manorhamilton
Cully	138	Carrigallen	Drumreilly	Bawnboy
Cunnion	124	Drumahaire	Killarga	Manorhamilton
Curragha	180	Leitrim	Kiltubbrid	Carrick on Shannon
Curragha	167	Mohill	Mohill	Mohill
Curraghaboy	174	Carrigallen	Carrigallen	Bawnboy
Curraghan	275	Drumahaire	Drumlease	Manorhamilton
Curraghashillaun	76	Carrigallen	Oughteragh	Bawnboy
Curraghatawy	253	Carrigallen	Drumreilly	Bawnboy
Curraghfore	53	Drumahaire	Cloonclare	Manorhamilton
Curraghfore	203	Rosclogher	Killasnet	Manorhamilton
Curraghmartin	123	Leitrim	Annaduff	Carrick on Shannon
Curraghnabania	620	Carrigallen	Oughteragh	Bawnboy
Curraghnawall	235	Carrigallen	Oughteragh	Bawnboy
Curraghoaghry	97	Leitrim	Mohill	Mohill
Curraghs North	87	Drumahaire	Inishmagrath	Manorhamilton
Curraghs South	75	Drumahaire	Inishmagrath	Manorhamilton
Curraun	475	Mohill	Mohill	Mohill
Curry	157	Drumahaire	Killarga	Manorhamilton
Darkvalley	81	Drumahaire	Killarga	Manorhamilton
Deerpark	286	Rosclogher	Killasnet	Manorhamilton
Deffier	569	Leitrim	Kiltoghert	Carrick on Shannon
Dergvone	1,515	Drumahaire	Killarga	Manorhamilton
Dernahelty Beg	70	Carrigallen	Oughteragh	Bawnboy
Dernahelty More	464	Carrigallen	Oughteragh	Bawnboy
Dernasmallan	231	Carrigallen	Oughteragh	Bawnboy
Derradda	258	Carrigallen	Drumreilly	Bawnboy
Derreen	119	Leitrim	Annaduff	Carrick on Shannon
Derreen	139	Leitrim	Fenagh	Mohill
Derreen	223	Mohill	Mohill	Mohill
Derreen (Johnston)	740	Leitrim	Kiltubbrid	Carrick on Shannon
Derreen (Lloyd)	100	Leitrim	Kiltubbrid	Carrick on Shannon
Derreen (Southwell)	20	Leitrim	Kiltubbrid	Carrick on Shannon
Derreenageer	144	Drumahaire	Drumreilly	Carrick on Shannon
Derreens	149	Drumahaire	Inishmagrath	Manorhamilton
Derrinaher	151	Drumahaire	Killanummery	Manorhamilton
Derrindangan	91	Drumahaire	Inishmagrath	Manorhamilton
Derrindrehid	287	Carrigallen	Cloone	Mohill
Derrinivver	147	Carrigallen	Drumreilly	Bawnboy
Derrinkeher (Brady)	120	Carrigallen	Oughteragh	Bawnboy
Derrinkeher (McDonnell)	233	Carrigallen	Oughteragh	Bawnboy
Derrinkeher (Raycroft)	310	Carrigallen	Oughteragh	Bawnboy
Derrinkip	105	Leitrim	Fenagh	Mohill
Derrinloughan	736	Rosclogher	Rossinver	Ballyshannon
Derrintawny	200	Drumahaire	Killarga	Manorhamilton
Derrintawny Glebe	126	Drumahaire	Inishmagrath	Manorhamilton
Derrintober	192	Leitrim	Kiltoghert	Carrick on Shannon
Derrintonny	159	Leitrim	Kiltoghert	Carrick on Shannon
Derrinurn	121	Drumahaire	Inishmagrath	Manorhamilton
Derrinvoher	96	Drumahaire	Inishmagrath	Manorhamilton
Derrinvoney Lower	128	Drumahaire	Inishmagrath	Manorhamilton
Derrinvoney Upper	126	Drumahaire	Inishmagrath	Manorhamilton
Derrinweer	115	Drumahaire	Inishmagrath	Manorhamilton
Derrinwillin	154	Drumahaire	Drumreilly	Carrick on Shannon
Derrinwillin Glebe	123	Drumahaire	Inishmagrath	Manorhamilton
Derrybofin	91	Drumahaire	Inishmagrath	Manorhamilton
Derrybrack	195	Leitrim	Annaduff	Carrick on Shannon
Derrybrisk	175	Drumahaire	Killanummery	Manorhamilton
Derrycarne Demesne	365	Mohill	Annaduff	Mohill
Derrycullinan	150	Drumahaire	Inishmagrath	Manorhamilton
Derrycullinan Beg	18	Drumahaire	Inishmagrath	Manorhamilton
Derryduff	155	Rosclogher	Rossinver	Ballyshannon
Derrygoan	230	Carrigallen	Drumreilly	Bawnboy
Derryhallagh	211	Leitrim	Kiltoghert	Carrick on Shannon
Derryheck	495	Rosclogher	Rossinver	Ballyshannon
Derrylahan	85	Carrigallen	Carrigallen	Bawnboy
Derrylaur	93	Leitrim	Annaduff (Annaghduff)	Carrick on Shannon
Derrylustin	168	Drumahaire	Inishmagrath	Manorhamilton
Derrymacoffin	119	Leitrim	Fenagh	Mohill
Derrynahimmirk	450	Rosclogher	Rossinver	Manorhamilton
Derrynahinch	78	Drumahaire	Inishmagrath	Manorhamilton
Derrynahona	129	Drumahaire	Drumreilly	Carrick on Shannon
Derrynalurgan	43	Drumahaire	Inishmagrath	Manorhamilton
Derrynaseer	550	Rosclogher	Rossinver	Ballyshannon
Derrynaseer	135	Leitrim	Kiltoghert	Carrick on Shannon
Derrynawana	211	Carrigallen	Oughteragh	Bawnboy
Derryniggin	206	Carrigallen	Carrigallen	Bawnboy
Derryoughter	189	Leitrim	Annaduff (Annaghduff)	Carrick on Shannon
Derryteigeroe	98	Leitrim	Kiltoghert	Carrick on Shannon
Derryvalannagher Glebe	131	Drumahaire	Inishmagrath	Manorhamilton
Derrywillow	307	Mohill	Annaduff	Mohill
Diffin	155	Carrigallen	Cloone	Mohill
Diffreen	715	Rosclogher	Killasnet	Manorhamilton
Donagh Beg	169	Drumahaire	Cloonclare	Manorhamilton
Donagh More	197	Drumahaire	Cloonclare	Manorhamilton
Dooard	144	Rosclogher	Rossinver	Ballyshannon
Doobally	387	Rosclogher	Rossinver	Ballyshannon
Doochorran	235	Carrigallen	Drumreilly	Bawnboy
Doolargy Glebe	136	Drumahaire	Inishmagrath	Manorhamilton
Doonarah	157	Mohill	Mohill	Mohill
Doonkelly	334	Drumahaire	Drumlease	Manorhamilton
Doonmorgan	92	Drumahaire	Drumlease	Manorhamilton
Doora	86	Mohill	Annaduff	Mohill
Doostroke	89	Rosclogher	Rossinver	Ballyshannon
Dorrusawillin	92	Leitrim	Kiltoghert	Carrick on Shannon
Drimna	113	Mohill	Mohill	Mohill
Driny	293	Leitrim	Kiltubbrid	Carrick on Shannon
Drishoge	38	Leitrim	Annaduff	Carrick on Shannon
Dristernan	135	Leitrim	Annaduff	Carrick on Shannon
Dristernaun	66	Leitrim	Kiltoghert	Carrick on Shannon
Dromore	164	Carrigallen	Oughteragh	Bawnboy
Dromore	125	Leitrim	Kiltoghert	Carrick on Shannon
Dromore	159	Drumahaire	Killanummery	Manorhamilton
Dromore	64	Rosclogher	Killasnet	Manorhamilton
Dromore	154	Carrigallen	Cloone	Mohill
Drumacolla	72	Rosclogher	Rossinver	Ballyshannon
Drumad (Beirne)	112	Leitrim	Kiltubbrid	Carrick on Shannon
Drumad (Moran)	129	Leitrim	Kiltubbrid	Carrick on Shannon
Drumadorn	311	Mohill	Cloone	Mohill
Drumadykey	57	Leitrim	Kiltubbrid	Carrick on Shannon
Drumahaire	123	Drumahaire	Drumlease	Manorhamilton
Drumahira	71	Carrigallen	Drumreilly	Bawnboy
Drumaleague	153	Leitrim	Kiltubbrid	Carrick on Shannon
Drumanure	169	Rosclogher	Rossinver	Ballyshannon
Drumanure	206	Carrigallen	Carrigallen	Bawnboy
Drumany	98	Carrigallen	Oughteragh	Bawnboy
Drumany	111	Leitrim	Kiltubbrid	Carrick on Shannon
Drumany	104	Drumahaire	Killanummery	Manorhamilton
Drumany (O'Brien)	126	Mohill	Fenagh	Mohill
Drumany (or Beirne)	122	Carrigallen	Fenagh	Bawnboy
Drumany (Tenants)	106	Mohill	Fenagh	Mohill
Drumany Glebe	158	Drumahaire	Killarga	Manorhamilton
Drumaragh	181	Leitrim	Kiltubbrid	Carrick on Shannon
Drumard (Jones)	393	Mohill	Mohill	Mohill
Drumard (Magerraun)	452	Mohill	Mohill	Mohill
Drumarigna	123	Carrigallen	Drumreilly	Bawnboy
Drumaweel Glebe	163	Leitrim	Kiltubbrid	Carrick on Shannon
Drumbad	170	Carrigallen	Oughteragh	Bawnboy
Drumbad	159	Mohill	Cloone	Mohill
Drumbeighra	160	Mohill	Mohill	Mohill
Drumbibe	196	Carrigallen	Oughteragh	Bawnboy
Drumbinnis	106	Carrigallen	Cloone	Mohill
Drumboher	286	Mohill	Cloone	Mohill
Drumboy	254	Mohill	Mohill	Mohill
Drumbrahade	120	Drumahaire	Inishmagrath	Manorhamilton
Drumbranned	145	Leitrim	Kiltubbrid	Carrick on Shannon
Drumbrecanlis	497	Carrigallen	Carrigallen	Mohill
Drumbrick	73	Carrigallen	Drumreilly	Bawnboy
Drumbullog	153	Leitrim	Kiltubbrid	Carrick on Shannon
Drumcanon	160	Carrigallen	Carrigallen	Mohill
Drumcarra	180	Leitrim	Fenagh	Mohill
Drumcashel	477	Rosclogher	Rossinver	Ballyshannon
Drumcashlagh	135	Drumahaire	Killarga	Manorhamilton
Drumcattan	206	Leitrim	Fenagh	Mohill
Drumcollagan	261	Mohill	Mohill	Mohill
Drumcollop	185	Mohill	Fenagh	Mohill
Drumcong	142	Leitrim	Kiltubbrid	Carrick on Shannon
Drumconlevan	107	Carrigallen	Drumreilly	Bawnboy
Drumconny	477	Mohill	Cloone	Mohill
Drumconor	349	Drumahaire	Killanummery	Manorhamilton
Drumcoora	97	Leitrim	Kiltoghert	Carrick on Shannon
Drumcoora	86	Mohill	Annaduff	Mohill
Drumcoura	706	Carrigallen	Drumreilly	Bawnboy
Drumcree	185	Mohill	Annaduff	Carrick on Shannon
Drumcroman	313	Carrigallen	Oughteragh	Bawnboy
Drumcroman	145	Leitrim	Kiltoghert	Carrick on Shannon
Drumcromaun	96	Leitrim	Kiltubbrid	Carrick on Shannon
Drumcroy	109	Mohill	Mohill	Mohill
Drumcullion	202	Carrigallen	Drumreilly	Bawnboy
Drumdarkan	278	Mohill	Cloone	Mohill
Drumdart	134	Leitrim	Mohill	Mohill
Drumdartan Glebe	147	Carrigallen	Oughteragh	Bawnboy
Drumderg	200	Carrigallen	Drumreilly	Bawnboy
Drumderg	141	Leitrim	Kiltoghert	Carrick on Shannon
Drumderg	127	Drumahaire	Killarga	Manorhamilton
Drumderglin	393	Carrigallen	Carrigallen	Mohill
Drumdiffer	407	Carrigallen	Drumreilly	Bawnboy
Drumdillure	67	Rosclogher	Killasnet	Manorhamilton
Drumdoo	239	Mohill	Mohill	Mohill
Drumduff	115	Leitrim	Kiltoghert	Carrick on Shannon
Drumduff	39	Leitrim	Kiltoghert	Carrick on Shannon
Drumduff	203	Drumahaire	Killanummery	Manorhamilton
Drumduffy	184	Drumahaire	Killarga	Manorhamilton
Drumeanan Beg	67	Leitrim	Fenagh	Mohill
Drumeanan More	95	Leitrim	Fenagh	Mohill
Drumeela	154	Carrigallen	Carrigallen	Bawnboy
Drumercross	98	Carrigallen	Carrigallen	Bawnboy
Drumergoole	249	Carrigallen	Carrigallen	Bawnboy
Drumerkeane	528	Carrigallen	Cloone	Mohill
Drumgane	113	Rosclogher	Rossinver	Manorhamilton
Drumgarn	101	Mohill	Mohill	Mohill
Drumgeaglom	157	Leitrim	Kiltoghert	Carrick on Shannon
Drumgilra	116	Leitrim	Annaduff	Carrick on Shannon
Drumgilra	372	Mohill	Cloone	Mohill
Drumgorman	224	Leitrim	Kiltoghert	Carrick on Shannon
Drumgowla	245	Leitrim	Kiltoghert	Carrick on Shannon
Drumgowla	454	Mohill	Cloone	Mohill
Drumgownagh	191	Carrigallen	Oughteragh	Bawnboy
Drumgownagh	190	Leitrim	Kiltoghert	Carrick on Shannon
Drumgownagh	462	Mohill	Cloone	Mohill
Drumgownagh	258	Leitrim	Mohill	Mohill
Drumgrania	335	Mohill	Cloone	Mohill
Drumgud	79	Leitrim	Kiltubbrid	Carrick on Shannon
Drumgunny	218	Carrigallen	Cloone	Mohill
**Drumhaire**	Town	Drumahaire	Drumlease	Manorhamilton
Drumhallagh	419	Mohill	Cloone	Mohill
Drumhalry	194	Carrigallen	Carrigallen	Bawnboy
Drumhalwy	31	Leitrim	Kiltoghert	Carrick on Shannon
Drumhany	77	Mohill	Mohill	Mohill
Drumhany North	109	Mohill	Mohill	Mohill
Drumhany South	291	Mohill	Mohill	Mohill
Drumharkan	162	Leitrim	Fenagh	Mohill
Drumharkan Glebe	569	Mohill	Clone	Mohill
Drumhass	257	Mohill	Cloone	Mohill
Drumhauver	89	Leitrim	Kiltoghert	Carrick on Shannon
Drumheckil	91	Leitrim	Kiltoghert	Carrick on Shannon
Drumherriff	212	Leitrim	Kiltoghert	Carrick on Shannon
Drumhierny	216	Leitrim	Kiltoghert	Carrick on Shannon
Drumhirk	1,310	Mohill	Cloone	Mohill
Drumhirk	90	Mohill	Mohill	Mohill
Drumhubbrid	157	Leitrim	Kiltubbrid	Carrick on Shannon
Drumillion	71	Drumahaire	Killarga	Manorhamilton
Druminalass	133	Drumahaire	Drumreilly	Carrick on Shannon
Druminargid	164	Rosclogher	Rossinver	Manorhamilton
Drumineigh Glebe	150	Leitrim	Kiltubbrid	Carrick on Shannon
Drumingna	205	Leitrim	Kiltubbrid	Carrick on Shannon
Druminshin	32	Drumahaire	Cloonclare	Manorhamilton
Druminshin Glebe	667	Carrigallen	Carrigallen	Mohill
Druminshingore	408	Carrigallen	Carrigallen	Bawnboy
Druminuff	113	Carrigallen	Carrigallen	Bawnboy
Drumkeel	155	Drumahaire	Killarga	Manorhamilton
Drumkeelan	200	Leitrim	Kiltubbrid	Carrick on Shannon
Drumkeelan Beg	120	Leitrim	Kiltoghert	Carrick on Shannon
Drumkeelan More	123	Leitrim	Kiltoghert	Carrick on Shannon
Drumkeelwick	157	Carrigallen	Carrigallen	Mohill
Drumkeen	242	Carrigallen	Oughteragh	Bawnboy
**Drumkeeran**	Town	Drumahaire	Inishmagrath	Manorhamilton
Drumkeeran	149	Leitrim	Kiltoghert	Carrick on Shannon
Drumkeeran	43	Drumahaire	Inishmagrath	Manorhamilton
Drumkeeran	113	Leitrim	Annaduff	Mohill
Drumkeilvy	462	Mohill	Cloone	Mohill
Drumkilla	112	Mohill	Mohill	Mohill
Drumkilleen	100	Mohill	Mohill	Mohill
Drumkirwan	129	Leitrim	Fenagh	Mohill
Drumlaggagh	197	Mohill	Cloone	Mohill
Drumlaheen	402	Leitrim	Fenagh	Mohill
Drumlara	177	Mohill	Mohill	Mohill
Drumlea	340	Carrigallen	Drumreilly	Bawnboy
Drumleague	295	Leitrim	Kiltoghert	Carrick on Shannon
Drumlease	221	Drumahaire	Drumlease	Manorhamilton
Drumleevan	209	Carrigallen	Carrigallen	Bawnboy
Drumliffin Glebe	182	Leitrim	Kiltoghert	Carrick on Shannon
Drumlitten (Besborough)	48	Leitrim	Fenagh	Mohill
Drumlitten (King)	57	Leitrim	Fenagh	Mohill
Drumlom	166	Mohill	Annaduff	Mohill
Drumlonan	131	Carrigallen	Oughteragh	Bawnboy
Drumloona	133	Carrigallen	Carrigallen	Bawnboy
Drumlowan	138	Mohill	Mohill	Mohill
Drumlumman	135	Leitrim	Kiltoghert	Carrick on Shannon
Drumlumman Glebe	68	Drumahaire	Killarga	Manorhamilton
Drummagh	80	Leitrim	Kiltoghert	Carrick on Shannon
Drummahan	244	Rosclogher	Killasnet	Manorhamilton
Drummanacappul	61	Drumahaire	Inishmagrath	Manorhamilton
Drummanasooan	85	Drumahaire	Inishmagrath	Manorhamilton
Drummanbane	168	Carrigallen	Cloone	Mohill
Drummanfaughnan	159	Drumahaire	Inishmagrath	Manorhamilton
Drummangarvagh	48	Drumahaire	Inishmagrath	Manorhamilton
Drummans	210	Rosclogher	Rossinver	Ballyshannon
Drummans	197	Rosclogher	Killasnet	Manorhamilton
Drummans Island	1	Drumahaire	Inishmagrath	Manorhamilton
Drummans Lower	185	Drumahaire	Inishmagrath	Manorhamilton
Drummans Upper	124	Drumahaire	Inishmagrath	Manorhamilton
Drummaunroe	77	Leitrim	Kiltoghert	Carrick on Shannon
Drummeen	219	Mohill	Cloone	Mohill
Drummucker	149	Carrigallen	Carrigallen	Bawnboy
Drummury	160	Drumahaire	Killanummery	Manorhamilton
Drumna	243	Mohill	Cloone	Mohill
Drumnacot	109	Leitrim	Annaduff	Carrick on Shannon
Drumnacross	105	Rosclogher	Killasnet	Manorhamilton
Drumnadober	228	Leitrim	Kiltoghert	Carrick on Shannon
Drumnafinnila	141	Drumahaire	Drumreilly	Carrick on Shannon
Drumnafinnila Barr	251	Drumahaire	Drumreilly	Carrick on Shannon
Drumnid	159	Mohill	Mohill	Mohill
**Drumod**	Town	Mohill	Annaduff	Mohill
Drumod Beg	245	Mohill	Annaduff	Mohill
Drumod More	248	Mohill	Annaduff	Mohill
Drumoghty Beg	104	Mohill	Mohill	Mohill
Drumoghty More	93	Mohill	Mohill	Mohill
Drumoula	106	Leitrim	Mohill	Mohill
Drumparsons	54	Leitrim	Kiltubbrid	Carrick on Shannon
Drumrackan	278	Carrigallen	Oughteragh	Bawnboy
Drumraghool North	207	Mohill	Mohill	Mohill
Drumraghool South	221	Mohill	Mohill	Mohill
Drumrahan	191	Leitrim	Mohill	Mohill
Drumraine Glebe	222	Carrigallen	Oughteragh	Mohill
Drumrane	286	Drumahaire	Killanummery	Manorhamilton
Drumreask	93	Mohill	Mohill	Mohill
Drumregan	140	Mohill	Mohill	Mohill
Drumreilly	253	Carrigallen	Drumreilly	Bawnboy
Drumrewy	149	Drumahaire	Inishmagrath	Manorhamilton
Drumristin	419	Drumahaire	Drumreilly	Carrick on Shannon
Drumroosk North	201	Leitrim	Fenagh	Mohill
Drumroosk South	177	Leitrim	Fenagh	Mohill
Drumruekill	194	Leitrim	Kiltubbrid	Carrick on Shannon
**Drumshanbo**	Town	Leitrim	Kiltoghert	Carrick-on-Shannon
Drumshanbo	127	Leitrim	Kiltoghert	Carrick on Shannon
Drumshanbo North	395	Mohill	Cloone	Mohill
Drumshanbo South	955	Mohill	Cloone	Mohill
Drumshangore	186	Carrigallen	Carrigallen	Bawnboy
Drumsillagh	264	Carrigallen	Carrigallen	Mohill
**Drumsna**	Town	Leitrim	Annaduff	Carrick on Shannon
Drumsna	271	Leitrim	Annaduff	Carrick on Shannon
Drungan	164	Rosclogher	Rossinver	Ballyshannon
Dumbrick	377	Carrigallen	Carrigallen	Bawnboy
Dunavinally	361	Mohill	Cloone	Mohill
Duncarbry	166	Rosclogher	Rossinver	Ballyshannon
Eden	211	Rosclogher	Rossinver	Ballyshannon
Eden	187	Drumahaire	Drumreilly	Carrick on Shannon
Edenavow	90	Leitrim	Kiltubbrid	Carrick on Shannon
Edenbaun	313	Mohill	Cloone	Mohill
Edenmore	71	Leitrim	Kiltubbrid	Carrick on Shannon
Edenvella	454	Rosclogher	Rossinver	Ballyshannon
Edergole	249	Drumahaire	Killanummery	Manorhamilton
Edergole	279	Mohill	Cloone	Mohill
Effrinagh	330	Leitrim	Kiltoghert	Carrick on Shannon
Errew	314	Carrigallen	Carrigallen	Mohill
Errew	268	Mohill	Cloone	Mohill
Erriff	891	Rosclogher	Rossinver	Ballyshannon
Esker	61	Mohill	Cloone	Mohill
Esker North	153	Mohill	Mohill	Mohill
Esker South	129	Mohill	Mohill	Mohill
Fahy	215	Drumahaire	Drumreilly	Carrick on Shannon
Fahymore	22	Leitrim	Kiltoghert	Carrick on Shannon
Fallacarra	877	Rosclogher	Killasnet	Manorhamilton
Falty	127	Drumahaire	Inishmagrath	Manorhamilton
Fargrim	173	Leitrim	Annaduff	Carrick on Shannon
Farnagh	210	Leitrim	Kiltoghert	Carrick on Shannon
Farnaght	480	Mohill	Cloone	Mohill
Farrow Barr of	844	Drumahaire	Cloonclare	Manorhamilton
Faslowart	125	Drumahaire	Drumlease	Manorhamilton
Faughary	1,162	Rosclogher	Killasnet	Manorhamilton
Faulties	99	Mohill	Annaduff	Mohill
Fawn	146	Leitrim	Kiltoghert	Carrick on Shannon
Fawn	615	Drumahaire	Drumlease	Manorhamilton
Fawnarry	221	Drumahaire	Drumlease	Manorhamilton
Fawnlion	719	Drumahaire	Drumlease	Manorhamilton
Fearglass North	340	Mohill	Cloone	Mohill
Fearglass South	233	Mohill	Cloone	Mohill
Fearnaght	387	Mohill	Annaduff	Mohill
Fedaro	44	Mohill	Annaduff	Mohill
Fenagh	120	Drumahaire	Killarga	Manorhamilton
Fenagh	395	Rosclogher	Killasnet	Manorhamilton
Fenagh Beg	299	Leitrim	Fenagh	Mohill
Fertagh	285	Rosclogher	Rossinver	Ballyshannon
Fingreagh Lower	52	Drumahaire	Inishmagrath	Manorhamilton
Fingreagh Upper	269	Drumahaire	Inishmagrath	Manorhamilton
Finiskill	232	Mohill	Mohill	Mohill
Finisklin	296	Leitrim	Kiltoghert	Carrick on Shannon
Finnalaghta	248	Mohill	Annaduff	Mohill
Fivepoundland	46	Rosclogher	Killasnet	Manorhamilton
Flughanagh	367	Drumahaire	Killanummery	Manorhamilton
Fohera	107	Carrigallen	Oughteragh	Bawnboy
Formoyle	152	Rosclogher	Killasnet	Manorhamilton
Foxborough	61	Leitrim	Annaduff	Carrick on Shannon
Friarstown	233	Drumahaire	Killanummery	Manorhamilton
Funshinagh	264	Leitrim	Kiltubbrid	Carrick on Shannon
Furnace (or Bleankillew)	177	Mohill	Annaduff	Mohill
Gannavagh	31	Rosclogher	Rossinver	Ballyshannon
Garadice	250	Carrigallen	Drumreilly	Bawnboy
Garadice	221	Mohill	Fenagh	Mohill
Gargrim	99	Rosclogher	Rossinver	Ballyshannon
Garvagh	67	Leitrim	Kiltubbrid	Carrick on Shannon
Garvagh	563	Drumahaire	Killanummery	Manorhamilton
Garvagh	274	Mohill	Mohill	Mohill
Garvagh Glebe	1,221	Drumahaire	Killanummery	Manorhamilton
Garvlough	235	Leitrim	Kiltoghert	Carrick on Shannon
Geaglom	333	Drumahaire	Inishmagrath	Manorhamilton
Georgia (or Gorteenoran)	56	Mohill	Mohill	Mohill
Geskanagh Glebe	79	Drumahaire	Killarga	Manorhamilton
Glack	313	Rosclogher	Rossinver	Ballyshannon
Glackaunadarragh	1,070	Drumahaire	Inishmagrath	Manorhamilton
Glasdrumman	592	Rosclogher	Killasnet	Manorhamilton
Glasdrumman	180	Leitrim	Fenagh	Mohill
Glasdrumman	115	Mohill	Mohill	Mohill
Glasdrumman Beg	140	Drumahaire	Inishmagrath	Manorhamilton
Glasdrumman More	284	Drumahaire	Inishmagrath	Manorhamilton
Glassalt	79	Drumahaire	Inishmagrath	Manorhamilton
Glebe	410	Carrigallen	Drumreilly	Bawnboy
Glebe	514	Rosclogher	Killasnet	Manorhamilton
Glebe	44	Leitrim	Fenagh	Mohill
Glenboy	621	Drumahaire	Cloonclare	Manorhamilton
Gleneige	514	Drumahaire	Drumlease	Manorhamilton
Glenkeel	316	Rosclogher	Cloonclare	Manorhamilton
Glennan Beg	68	Carrigallen	Oughteragh	Bawnboy
Glennan More	82	Carrigallen	Oughteragh	Bawnboy
Glennanbeg	48	Carrigallen	Drumreilly	Bawnboy
Gort	161	Leitrim	Kiltoghert	Carrick on Shannon
Gortachoosh	237	Carrigallen	Drumreilly	Bawnboy
Gortacorka	160	Drumahaire	Inishmagrath	Manorhamilton
Gortaggle	52	Leitrim	Annaduff	Carrick on Shannon
Gortahork	130	Drumahaire	Killarga	Manorhamilton
Gortanure North	178	Leitrim	Mohill	Mohill
Gortanure South	194	Mohill	Mohill	Mohill
Gortatresk	123	Drumahaire	Killarga	Manorhamilton
Gortavacan	100	Leitrim	Mohill	Mohill
Gortconnellan	115	Leitrim	Annaduff	Carrick on Shannon
Gorteen	78	Drumahaire	Killarga	Manorhamilton
Gorteen	194	Carrigallen	Cloone	Mohill
Gorteenachurry	559	Rosclogher	Rossinver	Manorhamilton
Gorteenaguinnell	537	Rosclogher	Killasnet	Manorhamilton
Gorteendarragh	438	Rosclogher	Rossinver	Ballyshannon
Gorteenoran	100	Mohill	Cloone	Mohill
Gorteenoran (or Georgia)	56	Mohill	Mohill	Mohill
Gortermone	487	Drumahaire	Killarga	Manorhamilton
Gortermone	644	Carrigallen	Carrigallen	Mohill
Gortfadda	162	Mohill	Mohill	Mohill
Gortgarrigan	286	Drumahaire	Cloonlogher	Manorhamilton
Gortinar	776	Rosclogher	Killasnet	Manorhamilton
Gortinee	236	Mohill	Annaduff	Mohill
Gortinty	217	Leitrim	Annaduff	Carrick on Shannon
Gortinure	137	Mohill	Cloone	Mohill
Gortletteragh	268	Mohill	Cloone	Mohill
Gortnacamdarragh	768	Carrigallen	Cloone	Mohill
Gortnacorkoge	254	Drumahaire	Killarga	Manorhamilton
Gortnacrieve	537	Rosclogher	Rossinver	Manorhamilton
Gortnaderrary	577	Rosclogher	Rossinver	Manorhamilton
Gortnagarn	729	Rosclogher	Killasnet	Manorhamilton
Gortnagrogerny	304	Rosclogher	Killasnet	Manorhamilton
Gortnagullion	402	Leitrim	Kiltubbrid	Carrick on Shannon
Gortnalamph	289	Mohill	Mohill	Mohill
Gortnalibbert	1,125	Drumahaire	Cloonclare	Manorhamilton
Gortnalougher	278	Mohill	Cloone	Mohill
Gortnalug	70	Mohill	Mohill	Mohill
Gortnarah	213	Mohill	Cloone	Mohill
Gortnasillagh	181	Rosclogher	Rossinver	Ballyshannon
Gortnasillagh East	313	Drumahaire	Inishmagrath	Manorhamilton
Gortnasillagh West	106	Drumahaire	Inishmagrath	Manorhamilton
Gortnaskeagh	646	Drumahaire	Drumlease	Manorhamilton
Gortnawaun	505	Leitrim	Kiltubbrid	Carrick on Shannon
Gortyclery	120	Mohill	Mohill	Mohill
Gowel	355	Leitrim	Kiltoghert	Carrick on Shannon
Gowlaun	461	Drumahaire	Killarga	Manorhamilton
Gowlaunrevagh	256	Drumahaire	Inishmagrath	Manorhamilton
Gowly	210	Leitrim	Kiltubbrid	Carrick on Shannon
Gradoge	121	Carrigallen	Cloone	Mohill
Grange	131	Leitrim	Kiltoghert	Carrick on Shannon
Greagh	25	Leitrim	Kiltoghert	Carrick on Shannon
Greagh	50	Drumahaire	Killarga	Manorhamilton
Greagh	228	Leitrim	Fenagh	Mohill
Greaghfarnagh	179	Leitrim	Kiltoghert	Carrick on Shannon
Greaghglass	179	Carrigallen	Oughteragh	Bawnboy
Greaghnadarragh	132	Drumahaire	Inishmagrath	Manorhamilton
Greaghnafarna	409	Drumahaire	Drumreilly	Carrick on Shannon
Greaghnafarna	1,122	Drumahaire	Killanummery	Manorhamilton
Greaghnaglogh	693	Drumahaire	Inishmagrath	Manorhamilton
Greaghnagon	47	Drumahaire	Killarga	Manorhamilton
Greaghnaguillaun	1,325	Leitrim	Kiltoghert	Carrick on Shannon
Greaghnaloughry	100	Carrigallen	Drumreilly	Bawnboy
Greaghnaslieve	447	Drumahaire	Inishmagrath	Manorhamilton
Greaghrevagh Beg	96	Carrigallen	Oughteragh	Bawnboy
Greaghrevagh More (or Glebe)	192	Carrigallen	Oughteragh	Bawnboy
Greenaun	200	Leitrim	Mohill	Mohill
Greenaun North	192	Drumahaire	Drumlease	Manorhamilton
Greenaun South	147	Drumahaire	Drumlease	Manorhamilton
Greyfield	88	Drumahaire	Inishmagrath	Manorhamilton
Grove	9	Leitrim	Kiltoghert	Carrick on Shannon
Gubacreeny	566	Rosclogher	Rossinver	Ballyshannon
Gubaderry	141	Drumahaire	Killarga	Manorhamilton
Gubadorris	447	Mohill	Cloone	Mohill
Gubadruish	129	Mohill	Mohill	Mohill
Gubagraffy	129	Mohill	Mohill	Mohill
Gubalaun	210	Rosclogher	Rossinver	Ballyshannon
Gubanummera	64	Rosclogher	Rossinver	Ballyshannon
Gubb	43	Drumahaire	Inishmagrath	Manorhamilton
Gubinea	496	Rosclogher	Killasnet	Manorhamilton
Gubmanus	110	Rosclogher	Rossinver	Manorhamilton
Gubnacurrafore	327	Drumahaire	Cloonclare	Manorhamilton
Gubnageer	228	Rosclogher	Rossinver	Manorhamilton
Gubnaveagh	784	Carrigallen	Oughteragh	Bawnboy
Gubroe	118	Mohill	Fenagh	Mohill
Gubs	333	Carrigallen	Drumreilly	Bawnboy
Gulladoo	630	Carrigallen	Carrigallen	Mohill
Halls	436	Mohill	Cloone	Mohill
Hartley	253	Leitrim	Kiltoghert	Carrick on Shannon
Headford	276	Leitrim	Annaduff	Carrick on Shannon
Inchmurrin (or Rabbit Island)	27	Mohill	Annaduff	Mohill
Inisheher	18	Rosclogher	Rossinver	Ballyshannon
Inishkeen	33	Rosclogher	Rossinver	Ballyshannon
Inishmagrath	6	Drumahaire	Drumreilly	Carrick on Shannon
Inishmean	20	Rosclogher	Rossinver	Ballyshannon
Inishmucker	18	Leitrim	Kiltoghert	Carrick on Shannon
Inishtemple	32	Rosclogher	Rossinver	Ballyshannon
**Jamestown**	Town	Leitrim	Kiltoghert	Carrick on Shannon
Jamestown	209	Leitrim	Kiltoghert	Carrick on Shannon
Keelagh	163	Mohill	Mohill	Mohill
Keeldra	284	Mohill	Cloone	Mohill
Keeloge	55	Leitrim	Mohill	Mohill
Keeloges	517	Rosclogher	Rossinver	Ballyshannon
Keelrin	13	Carrigallen	Carrigallen	Bawnboy
Keelrin	412	Carrigallen	Drumreilly	Bawnboy
Keenaghan	114	Leitrim	Kiltoghert	Carrick on Shannon
Keenheen	628	Carrigallen	Drumreilly	Bawnboy
Keonbrook	148	Leitrim	Kiltoghert	Carrick on Shannon
**Keshcarrigan**	Town	Leitrim	Kiltubbrid	Carrick on Shannon
Keshcarrigan	272	Leitrim	Kiltubbrid	Carrick on Shannon
Kilboderry	69	Leitrim	Kiltoghert	Carrick on Shannon
Kilbrackan	229	Carrigallen	Carrigallen	Mohill
Kilclare Beg	189	Leitrim	Kiltubbrid	Carrick on Shannon
Kilclare More	206	Leitrim	Kiltubbrid	Carrick on Shannon
Kilcoon	64	Drumahaire	Killanummery	Manorhamilton
Kilcoosy	496	Drumahaire	Drumlease	Manorhamilton
Kildoo	40	Mohill	Mohill	Mohill
Kildorragh	161	Carrigallen	Oughteragh	Bawnboy
Kildorragh	99	Leitrim	Kiltoghert	Carrick on Shannon
Kilgarriff	200	Drumahaire	Drumreilly	Carrick on Shannon
Killadiskert	155	Drumahaire	Inishmagrath	Manorhamilton
Killadough	125	Carrigallen	Oughteragh	Bawnboy
Killaglasheen	57	Carrigallen	Oughteragh	Bawnboy
Killahurk	558	Carrigallen	Carrigallen	Mohill
Killaleen	199	Drumahaire	Drumlease	Manorhamilton
Killamaun	406	Mohill	Mohill	Mohill
Killameen	263	Carrigallen	Drumreilly	Bawnboy
Killananima	88	Drumahaire	Killanummery	Manorhamilton
Killaneen	269	Carrigallen	Oughteragh	Bawnboy
Killanummery	243	Drumahaire	Killanummery	Manorhamilton
Killaphort	207	Carrigallen	Drumreilly	Bawnboy
Killarcan	339	Leitrim	Kiltoghert	Carrick on Shannon
Killarga	59	Drumahaire	Killarga	Manorhamilton
Killasanowl	158	Leitrim	Kiltoghert	Carrick on Shannon
Killavoggy	690	Drumahaire	Killanummery	Manorhamilton
Killea	681	Rosclogher	Cloonclare	Manorhamilton
Killeen	330	Drumahaire	Killanummery	Manorhamilton
Killenna Glebe	272	Drumahaire	Drumlease	Manorhamilton
Killerrin	152	Carrigallen	Carrigallen	Bawnboy
Killinaker	77	Mohill	Mohill	Mohill
Killooman	723	Drumahaire	Killarga	Manorhamilton
Killycloghan	57	Drumahaire	Cloonclare	Manorhamilton
Killydrum	208	Carrigallen	Carrigallen	Bawnboy
Killyfad	135	Mohill	Annaduff	Mohill
Killyfea	548	Carrigallen	Cloone	Mohill
Killygar	260	Carrigallen	Carrigallen	Bawnboy
Killymeehin	40	Rosclogher	Killasnet	Manorhamilton
Killyvehy	671	Mohill	Cloone	Mohill
Kilmacsherwell	174	Mohill	Fenagh	Mohill
Kilmaddaroe	207	Leitrim	Kiltoghert	Carrick on Shannon
Kilmaghera	144	Leitrim	Kiltoghert	Carrick on Shannon
Kilmakenny	379	Carrigallen	Cloone	Mohill
Kilmakerrill	205	Drumahaire	Cloonclare	Manorhamilton
Kilmore	204	Drumahaire	Drumreilly	Carrick on Shannon
Kilmore	140	Drumahaire	Drumlease	Manorhamilton
Kilmore	122	Drumahaire	Inishmagrath	Manorhamilton
Kilnacreevy	219	Carrigallen	Drumreilly	Bawnboy
Kilnagarns Lower	115	Drumahaire	Inishmagrath	Manorhamilton
Kilnagarns Upper	157	Drumahaire	Inishmagrath	Manorhamilton
Kilnagross	206	Leitrim	Kiltoghert	Carrick on Shannon
Kilnamaddyroe	118	Carrigallen	Oughteragh	Bawnboy
Kilnamarve	226	Carrigallen	Carrigallen	Bawnboy
Kilroosk	599	Rosclogher	Killasnet	Manorhamilton
Kilrush	146	Carrigallen	Oughteragh	Bawnboy
**Kiltoghert**	Town	Leitrim	Kiltoghert	Carrick on Shannon
Kiltoghert	813	Leitrim	Kiltoghert	Carrick on Shannon
Kiltubbrid	103	Leitrim	Kiltubbrid	Carrick on Shannon
Kiltybardan	390	Carrigallen	Oughteragh	Bawnboy
Kiltycarney	206	Leitrim	Kiltoghert	Carrick on Shannon
**Kiltyclogher**	Town	Rosclogher	Cloonclare	Manorhamilton
Kiltyclogher	1,743	Rosclogher	Cloonclare	Manorhamilton
Kiltycreevagh	110	Carrigallen	Oughteragh	Bawnboy
Kiltyfeenaghty Glebe	146	Drumahaire	Inishmagrath	Manorhamilton
Kiltyfinnan	118	Mohill	Fenagh	Mohill
Kiltygerry	190	Carrigallen	Oughteragh	Bawnboy
Kiltyhugh	231	Carrigallen	Oughteragh	Bawnboy
Kiltymoodan	183	Carrigallen	Oughteragh	Bawnboy
Kiltynashinnagh	182	Carrigallen	Oughteragh	Bawnboy
Kiltynashinnagh	53	Leitrim	Kiltubbrid	Carrick on Shannon
Kinkillew	447	Rosclogher	Rossinver	Manorhamilton
**Kinlough**	Town	Rosclogher	Rossinver	Ballyshannon
Kinlough	293	Rosclogher	Rossinver	Ballyshannon
Kinnara Glebe	181	Drumahaire	Drumlease	Manorhamilton
Kivvy	189	Carrigallen	Carrigallen	Mohill
Knockacosan	74	Drumahaire	Inishmagrath	Manorhamilton
Knockacullion	1,740	Carrigallen	Oughteragh	Bawnboy
Knockacullion	96	Drumahaire	Killarga	Manorhamilton
Knockadrinan	106	Mohill	Mohill	Mohill
Knockalongford	25	Mohill	Mohill	Mohill
Knockanroe	48	Rosclogher	Rossinver	Ballyshannon
Knockanroe	97	Carrigallen	Oughteragh	Bawnboy
Knockateean	276	Drumahaire	Inishmagrath	Manorhamilton
Knockbrack	23	Rosclogher	Rossinver	Ballyshannon
Knockmacrory	60	Mohill	Mohill	Mohill
Knockmullin	167	Leitrim	Fenagh	Mohill
Knocknaclassagh	282	Rosclogher	Killasnet	Manorhamilton
Knocknacoska	126	Drumahaire	Inishmagrath	Manorhamilton
Knocknasawna	135	Leitrim	Kiltoghert	Carrick on Shannon
Knockroosk	113	Mohill	Fenagh	Mohill
Knocks	121	Carrigallen	Drumreilly	Bawnboy
Labbyeslin	61	Mohill	Mohill	Mohill
Lackagh	1,140	Drumahaire	Killarga	Manorhamilton
Lackoon	863	Drumahaire	Cloonclare	Manorhamilton
Laghta	602	Rosclogher	Rossinver	Ballyshannon
Laghty	231	Drumahaire	Cloonclare	Manorhamilton
Laghty Barr	506	Drumahaire	Cloonclare	Manorhamilton
Lahard	151	Carrigallen	Oughteragh	Bawnboy
Laheen	245	Carrigallen	Carrigallen	Bawnboy
Laheen	119	Leitrim	Kiltubbrid	Carrick on Shannon
Laheen (Peyton)	80	Leitrim	Kiltubbrid	Carrick on Shannon
Laheen North	129	Leitrim	Mohill	Mohill
Laheen South	94	Mohill	Mohill	Mohill
Laheennamona	19	Mohill	Mohill	Mohill
Laragh	175	Leitrim	Fenagh	Mohill
Lareen	340	Rosclogher	Rossinver	Ballyshannon
Larga	86	Drumahaire	Inishmagrath	Manorhamilton
Largan	169	Leitrim	Kiltoghert	Carrick on Shannon
Largan Mountain	164	Leitrim	Kiltoghert	Carrick on Shannon
Larganavaddoge	441	Rosclogher	Rossinver	Ballyshannon
Largandill	133	Drumahaire	Drumreilly	Carrick on Shannon
Largandoon	597	Rosclogher	Killasnet	Manorhamilton
Larganhugh	245	Rosclogher	Rossinver	Ballyshannon
Largantemple	31	Rosclogher	Killasnet	Manorhamilton
Largy	1,705	Rosclogher	Killasnet	Manorhamilton
Largydonnell	714	Rosclogher	Rossinver	Ballyshannon
Larkfield	2,064	Drumahaire	Cloonlogher	Manorhamilton
Lattone	539	Rosclogher	Rossinver	Manorhamilton
Launtaggart	706	Rosclogher	Killasnet	Manorhamilton
Lavagh	134	Leitrim	Annaduff	Carrick on Shannon
Lavagh	92	Drumahaire	Inishmagrath	Manorhamilton
Lavareen	226	Carrigallen	Cloone	Mohill
Lavaur	226	Leitrim	Kiltoghert	Carrick on Shannon
Leamanish	276	Mohill	Fenagh	Mohill
Leamaskally	179	Drumahaire	Killarga	Manorhamilton
Lear	249	Mohill	Cloone	Mohill
Lecarrow (or Strandhill)	54	Drumahaire	Inishmagrath	Manorhamilton
Leckan	292	Carrigallen	Drumreilly	Bawnboy
Leckanarainey	852	Rosclogher	Killasnet	Manorhamilton
Leckaun	220	Drumahaire	Drumlease	Manorhamilton
Leckaun	175	Drumahaire	Inishmagrath	Manorhamilton
Lecknagh	95	Mohill	Cloone	Mohill
Leean	538	Drumahaire	Drumlease	Manorhamilton
Leganamer	81	Carrigallen	Drumreilly	Bawnboy
Leitra	156	Leitrim	Kiltubbrid	Carrick on Shannon
**Leitrim**	Town	Leitrim	Kiltoghert	Carrick on Shannon
Leitrim	139	Leitrim	Kiltoghert	Carrick on Shannon
Leitrim	101	Leitrim	Kiltubbrid	Carrick on Shannon
Leitrim Lower	182	Mohill	Mohill	Mohill
Leitrim Upper	177	Mohill	Mohill	Mohill
Leonagh	241	Drumahaire	Killarga	Manorhamilton
Letter	310	Drumahaire	Inishmagrath	Manorhamilton
Letterfine	135	Leitrim	Kiltubbrid	Carrick on Shannon
Lisacoghil	208	Drumahaire	Inishmagrath	Manorhamilton
Lisadlooey	37	Drumahaire	Inishmagrath	Manorhamilton
Lisbrockan	69	Leitrim	Kiltoghert	Carrick on Shannon
Liscallyroan	151	Leitrim	Kiltoghert	Carrick on Shannon
Liscarban	203	Leitrim	Kiltubbrid	Carrick on Shannon
Liscloonadea	224	Mohill	Mohill	Mohill
Lisconor	96	Leitrim	Kiltoghert	Carrick on Shannon
Liscuilfea	97	Carrigallen	Oughteragh	Bawnboy
Liscuillew Lower	168	Drumahaire	Inishmagrath	Manorhamilton
Liscuillew Upper	265	Drumahaire	Inishmagrath	Manorhamilton
Lisdadanan	136	Mohill	Mohill	Mohill
Lisdarush	608	Rosclogher	Rossinver	Manorhamilton
Lisdauky	103	Leitrim	Kiltoghert	Carrick on Shannon
Lisdromacrone	108	Leitrim	Kiltubbrid	Carrick on Shannon
Lisdromafarna	184	Leitrim	Kiltoghert	Carrick on Shannon
Lisdromarea North	265	Leitrim	Kiltoghert	Carrick on Shannon
Lisdromarea South	57	Leitrim	Kiltoghert	Carrick on Shannon
Lisdrumgivel Lower	77	Leitrim	Mohill	Mohill
Lisdrumgivel Upper	94	Leitrim	Mohill	Mohill
Lisdrumgran	90	Drumahaire	Inishmagrath	Manorhamilton
Lisduff	97	Leitrim	Annaduff	Carrick on Shannon
Lisduff	77	Leitrim	Kiltoghert	Carrick on Shannon
Lisfuiltaghan	360	Drumahaire	Inishmagrath	Manorhamilton
Lisgarney	95	Leitrim	Kiltoghert	Carrick on Shannon
Lisgavneen	386	Drumahaire	Killarga	Manorhamilton
Lisgillock Glebe	1,063	Mohill	Cloone	Mohill
Lisgool	28	Rosclogher	Rossinver	Ballyshannon
Lisgorman	849	Drumahaire	Cloonlogher	Manorhamilton
Lisgruddy	216	Carrigallen	Drumreilly	Bawnboy
Lislahy	99	Carrigallen	Drumreilly	Bawnboy
Lislea	57	Leitrim	Annaduff	Carrick on Shannon
Lismakeegan	119	Leitrim	Kiltoghert	Carrick on Shannon
Lismannagh	103	Leitrim	Annaduff	Carrick on Shannon
Lismoyle	185	Leitrim	Annaduff	Carrick on Shannon
Lisnabrack	42	Leitrim	Kiltoghert	Carrick on Shannon
Lisnabrack	582	Rosclogher	Killasnet	Manorhamilton
Lisnagat	43	Leitrim	Kiltoghert	Carrick on Shannon
Lisnagea	189	Leitrim	Kiltoghert	Carrick on Shannon
Lisnagowan	157	Drumahaire	Killarga	Manorhamilton
Lisnanaw	83	Drumahaire	Inishmagrath	Manorhamilton
Lisnanorrus	88	Drumahaire	Inishmagrath	Manorhamilton
Lisnatullagh	330	Carrigallen	Oughteragh	Bawnboy
Lisomadaun	159	Mohill	Mohill	Mohill
Lisroughty	149	Carrigallen	Drumreilly	Bawnboy
Lissacarn	254	Carrigallen	Oughteragh	Bawnboy
Lissagarvan	1,090	Mohill	Cloone	Mohill
Lisseeghan	140	Leitrim	Kiltoghert	Carrick on Shannon
Lissinagroagh	791	Rosclogher	Cloonclare	Manorhamilton
Lissiniska	384	Rosclogher	Rossinver	Manorhamilton
Longfield	148	Carrigallen	Carrigallen	Bawnboy
Longstones	110	Carrigallen	Oughteragh	Bawnboy
Loughaphonta	73	Rosclogher	Cloonclare	Manorhamilton
Loughaphonta Barr	394	Rosclogher	Cloonclare	Manorhamilton
Loughconway	91	Leitrim	Kiltubbrid	Carrick on Shannon
Loughmuirran	438	Rosclogher	Rossinver	Ballyshannon
Loughros	681	Drumahaire	Cloonclare	Manorhamilton
Loughscur	97	Leitrim	Kiltubbrid	Carrick on Shannon
Lugalustran	72	Drumahaire	Drumlease	Manorhamilton
Lugasnaghta	565	Rosclogher	Cloonclare	Manorhamilton
Lugganammer	454	Carrigallen	Cloone	Mohill
Lughawagh	45	Drumahaire	Cloonclare	Manorhamilton
Lugmeeltan	235	Drumahaire	Inishmagrath	Manorhamilton
Lugmeen	50	Drumahaire	Inishmagrath	Manorhamilton
Lugmore	72	Drumahaire	Inishmagrath	Manorhamilton
Lugnafaughery	422	Rosclogher	Killasnet	Manorhamilton
Lugnagon	368	Carrigallen	Carrigallen	Bawnboy
Lugnaskeehan	269	Drumahaire	Killarga	Manorhamilton
Lurga	156	Mohill	Cloone	Mohill
Lurgan	674	Drumahaire	Cloonclare	Manorhamilton
**Lurganboy**	Town	Rosclogher	Killasnet	Manorhamilton
Lustia	153	Leitrim	Kiltoghert	Carrick on Shannon
Mackan	82	Leitrim	Kiltoghert	Carrick on Shannon
Magheramore	246	Rosclogher	Rossinver	Ballyshannon
Magurk	222	Drumahaire	Drumlease	Manorhamilton
Mahanagh	263	Leitrim	Kiltoghert	Carrick on Shannon
Mahanagh	196	Drumahaire	Inishmagrath	Manorhamilton
**Manorhamilton**	Town	Drumahaire	Cloonclare	Manorhamilton
**Manorhamilton**	Town	Rosclogher	Killasnet	Manorhamilton
Manorhamilton	175	Drumahaire	Cloonclare	Manorhamilton
Mautiagh	411	Rosclogher	Rossinver	Manorhamilton
Mayo	439	Carrigallen	Oughteragh	Bawnboy
Meelick	131	Leitrim	Mohill	Mohill
Meelragh (Nagur)	262	Mohill	Mohill	Mohill
Meelragh (Saggart)	166	Mohill	Mohill	Mohill
Meenagh	425	Drumahaire	Cloonclare	Manorhamilton
Meenagraun	439	Rosclogher	Rossinver	Manorhamilton
Meenaphuill	375	Rosclogher	Killasnet	Manorhamilton
Meenkeeragh	619	Drumahaire	Cloonclare	Manorhamilton
Meenymore	1,044	Drumahaire	Cloonclare	Manorhamilton
Millpark	41	Leitrim	Annaduff	Mohill
Milltown	116	Rosclogher	Killasnet	Manorhamilton
Miltron Glebe	337	Carrigallen	Cloone	Mohill
Minkill	97	Leitrim	Kiltoghert	Carrick on Shannon
Miskaun Glebe	327	Carrigallen	Oughteragh	Bawnboy
Modorragh	151	Drumahaire	Inishmagrath	Manorhamilton
Moher	191	Rosclogher	Rossinver	Ballyshannon
Moher	146	Carrigallen	Oughteragh	Bawnboy
Moher	130	Mohill	Annaduff	Mohill
Moher	70	Mohill	Mohill	Mohill
Moher (Gregg)	465	Leitrim	Kiltubbrid	Carrick on Shannon
Moheracreevy Glebe	94	Leitrim	Kiltoghert	Carrick on Shannon
Mohernameela	72	Leitrim	Mohill	Mohill
Moherrevan	221	Mohill	Annaduff	Mohill
Moherrevogagh	157	Leitrim	Kiltubbrid	Carrick on Shannon
**Mohill**	Town	Mohill	Mohill	Mohill
Mohill	116	Mohill	Mohill	Mohill
Mollynadinta	195	Rosclogher	Rossinver	Ballyshannon
Moneen	273	Rosclogher	Rossinver	Ballyshannon
Moneenageer	177	Drumahaire	Cloonclare	Manorhamilton
Moneenatieve	510	Drumahaire	Inishmagrath	Manorhamilton
Moneengaugagh	136	Rosclogher	Rossinver	Ballyshannon
Moneenlom	384	Drumahaire	Cloonclare	Manorhamilton
Moneenreave	208	Drumahaire	Inishmagrath	Manorhamilton
Moneenshinnagh	484	Drumahaire	Cloonclare	Manorhamilton
Moneyduff	167	Drumahaire	Cloonclare	Manorhamilton
Moneyduff	279	Drumahaire	Drumlease	Manorhamilton
Moneynure	32	Leitrim	Kiltoghert	Carrick on Shannon
Moneyroe	54	Mohill	Mohill	Mohill
Mong	274	Leitrim	Kiltoghert	Carrick on Shannon
Morerah	592	Drumahaire	Drumlease	Manorhamilton
Mough	175	Leitrim	Fenagh	Mohill
Mountainthird	159	Rosclogher	Killasnet	Manorhamilton
Mountcampbell	157	Leitrim	Annaduff	Carrick on Shannon
Muckanagh	196	Mohill	Cloone	Mohill
Mucklaghan Glebe	129	Leitrim	Annaduff	Carrick on Shannon
Mucklougher	84	Mohill	Mohill	Mohill
Muckros	262	Leitrim	Fenagh	Mohill
Muckrum	217	Rosclogher	Rossinver	Ballyshannon
Mulkaun	383	Rosclogher	Killasnet	Manorhamilton
Mullagh	368	Drumahaire	Drumlease	Manorhamilton
Mullagh	210	Mohill	Annaduff	Mohill
Mullaghaneigh	58	Leitrim	Kiltubbrid	Carrick on Shannon
Mullaghbaun	98	Drumahaire	Inishmagrath	Manorhamilton
Mullaghboy	474	Carrigallen	Drumreilly	Bawnboy
Mullaghboy	123	Leitrim	Kiltubbrid	Carrick on Shannon
Mullaghbrack	326	Mohill	Cloone	Mohill
Mullaghcashel	58	Drumahaire	Inishmagrath	Manorhamilton
Mullaghdoo	173	Drumahaire	Killanummery	Manorhamilton
Mullaghfadda	67	Drumahaire	Inishmagrath	Manorhamilton
Mullaghgarve	836	Leitrim	Kiltubbrid	Carrick on Shannon
Mullaghmore	211	Carrigallen	Drumreilly	Bawnboy
Mullaghmore	422	Drumahaire	Killarga	Manorhamilton
Mullaghnameely	108	Leitrim	Fenagh	Mohill
Mullaghrigny	63	Mohill	Mohill	Mohill
Mullaghsallagh	90	Leitrim	Kiltoghert	Carrick on Shannon
Mullaghycullen	215	Leitrim	Kiltubbrid	Carrick on Shannon
Mullanadarragh	443	Carrigallen	Carrigallen	Mohill
Mullanaleck	122	Rosclogher	Rossinver	Ballyshannon
Mullanaskeagh	121	Drumahaire	Killanummery	Manorhamilton
Mullanavockaun	165	Rosclogher	Rossinver	Ballyshannon
Mullanyduff	158	Rosclogher	Rossinver	Ballyshannon
Mullanyduff	157	Rosclogher	Killasnet	Manorhamilton
Mullaun	37	Leitrim	Annaduff	Carrick on Shannon
Mullaun	220	Drumahaire	Cloonclare	Manorhamilton
Mullaun	63	Mohill	Mohill	Mohill
Mullaun Glebe	185	Leitrim	Kiltubbrid	Carrick on Shannon
Mullies	194	Rosclogher	Killasnet	Manorhamilton
Mullyaster	163	Carrigallen	Carrigallen	Bawnboy
Mullynadrumman	75	Mohill	Cloone	Mohill
Mulnasillagh	110	Carrigallen	Oughteragh	Bawnboy
Mulnavannoge	175	Carrigallen	Oughteragh	Bawnboy
Munakill	447	Drumahaire	Cloonclare	Manorhamilton
Munnagashel	183	Drumahaire	Cloonclare	Manorhamilton
Murhaun	226	Leitrim	Kiltoghert	Carrick on Shannon
Newbrook	114	Leitrim	Kiltoghert	Carrick on Shannon
**Newtown Gore**	Town	Carrigallen	Carrigallen	Bawnboy
Newtowngore	171	Carrigallen	Carrigallen	Bawnboy
Nure	299	Rosclogher	Killasnet	Manorhamilton
Oghill	119	Mohill	Mohill	Mohill
Otter Island	1	Mohill	Annaduff	Mohill
Oughteragh	263	Carrigallen	Oughteragh	Bawnboy
Park	276	Rosclogher	Rossinver	Ballyshannon
Patricks Island	1	Drumahaire	Cloonclare	Manorhamilton
Pollboy	222	Drumahaire	Cloonlogher	Manorhamilton
Pollnagappul	24	Leitrim	Kiltoghert	Carrick on Shannon
Port	70	Leitrim	Kiltoghert	Carrick on Shannon
Portancoght	78	Leitrim	Kiltoghert	Carrick on Shannon
Pottore	299	Carrigallen	Oughteragh	Bawnboy
Poundhill	74	Rosclogher	Killasnet	Manorhamilton
Prabagh	169	Carrigallen	Oughteragh	Bawnboy
Prughlish	239	Leitrim	Kiltubbrid	Carrick on Shannon
Rabbit Island (or Inchmurrin)	27	Mohill	Annaduff	Mohill
Racullen	299	Mohill	Cloone	Mohill
Raheelin	639	Rosclogher	Rossinver	Manorhamilton
Raheenduff	64	Rosclogher	Killasnet	Manorhamilton
Ramooney	159	Drumahaire	Cloonclare	Manorhamilton
Rantoge Glebe	293	Leitrim	Kiltubbrid	Carrick on Shannon
Rassaun	440	Carrigallen	Cloone	Mohill
Rassaun East	377	Rosclogher	Killasnet	Manorhamilton
Rassaun West	505	Rosclogher	Killasnet	Manorhamilton
Rathbaun	289	Drumahaire	Killanummery	Manorhamilton
Redbrae	78	Rosclogher	Rossinver	Ballyshannon
Rinn	415	Mohill	Cloone	Mohill
Rinnacurreen	183	Leitrim	Kiltoghert	Carrick on Shannon
Rinnagowna	194	Mohill	Mohill	Mohill
**Roosky**	Town	Mohill	Mohill	Mohill
Roosky	190	Rosclogher	Rossinver	Ballyshannon
Roosky	119	Mohill	Mohill	Mohill
Rooskynamona	407	Mohill	Mohill	Mohill
Roscarban	279	Leitrim	Kiltubbrid	Carrick on Shannon
Rosclogher	119	Rosclogher	Rossinver	Ballyshannon
Roscunnish	136	Leitrim	Kiltoghert	Carrick on Shannon
Roscunnish	137	Leitrim	Kiltubbrid	Carrick on Shannon
Rosdoowaun	179	Mohill	Mohill	Mohill
Rosfriar	263	Rosclogher	Rossinver	Ballyshannon
Rosharry	224	Mohill	Mohill	Mohill
Ross	287	Drumahaire	Cloonclare	Manorhamilton
Ross	64	Drumahaire	Inishmagrath	Manorhamilton
Ross Beg	435	Mohill	Cloone	Mohill
Ross Beg Glebe	60	Drumahaire	Inishmagrath	Manorhamilton
Ross More	124	Drumahaire	Inishmagrath	Manorhamilton
Ross More	172	Mohill	Cloone	Mohill
Rossy	288	Leitrim	Kiltubbrid	Carrick on Shannon
Rubbal	168	Drumahaire	Drumlease	Manorhamilton
Rue	51	Leitrim	Kiltoghert	Carrick on Shannon
Sallaghan	23	Leitrim	Kiltoghert	Carrick on Shannon
Sallow Island	1	Mohill	Annaduff	Mohill
Scardaun	253	Leitrim	Kiltubbrid	Carrick on Shannon
Scrabbagh	51	Leitrim	Kiltubbrid	Carrick on Shannon
Seltan	499	Drumahaire	Inishmagrath	Manorhamilton
Seltan	145	Mohill	Mohill	Mohill
Seltan (McDonald)	69	Leitrim	Kiltubbrid	Carrick on Shannon
Seltan (Moran)	65	Leitrim	Kiltubbrid	Carrick on Shannon
Seltanahunshin	824	Carrigallen	Oughteragh	Bawnboy
Seltannasaggart (or Corry Mountain)	131	Drumahaire	Inishmagrath	Manorhamilton
Seltannaskeagh	47	Drumahaire	Inishmagrath	Manorhamilton
Sessiagh	120	Carrigallen	Carrigallen	Mohill
Shancarrick	85	Drumahaire	Killarga	Manorhamilton
Shancurragh	45	Rosclogher	Killasnet	Manorhamilton
Shancurragh, Barr of	53	Rosclogher	Killasnet	Manorhamilton
Shancurry	270	Leitrim	Kiltoghert	Carrick on Shannon
Shannagh	84	Mohill	Mohill	Mohill
Shanraw	109	Leitrim	Kiltubbrid	Carrick on Shannon
Shanvaus	220	Rosclogher	Killasnet	Manorhamilton
Shasgar	248	Rosclogher	Rossinver	Ballyshannon
Shasmore	356	Rosclogher	Rossinver	Manorhamilton
Shass	315	Drumahaire	Inishmagrath	Manorhamilton
Sheean	38	Rosclogher	Rossinver	Ballyshannon
Sheebeg	109	Leitrim	Kiltubbrid	Carrick on Shannon
Sheemore	321	Leitrim	Kiltoghert	Carrick on Shannon
Sheena	121	Drumahaire	Inishmagrath	Manorhamilton
Sheffield	181	Leitrim	Kiltoghert	Carrick on Shannon
Sheskin	94	Drumahaire	Killarga	Manorhamilton
Sheskinacurry	145	Leitrim	Kiltoghert	Carrick on Shannon
Shesknan	481	Rosclogher	Rossinver	Ballyshannon
Shivdelagh	158	Drumahaire	Inishmagrath	Manorhamilton
Shivdilla	113	Mohill	Mohill	Mohill
Shoalmore	121	Mohill	Mohill	Mohill
Skeamartin	17	Leitrim	Mohill	Mohill
Skreeny	151	Drumahaire	Cloonclare	Manorhamilton
Skreeny	58	Rosclogher	Killasnet	Manorhamilton
Skreeny Little	144	Drumahaire	Cloonclare	Manorhamilton
Sleveen	77	Drumahaire	Killarga	Manorhamilton
Slievenakilla	2,805	Drumahaire	Drumreilly	Carrick on Shannon
Sliganagh	140	Drumahaire	Killanummery	Manorhamilton
Socknalougher	80	Drumahaire	Killarga	Manorhamilton
Socks	84	Drumahaire	Killarga	Manorhamilton
Sonnagh	121	Carrigallen	Carrigallen	Mohill
Springfield	77	Mohill	Mohill	Mohill
Srabrick	340	Drumahaire	Cloonlogher	Manorhamilton
Sracleighreen	537	Rosclogher	Killasnet	Manorhamilton
Sracreeghan	443	Rosclogher	Killasnet	Manorhamilton
Sracummer	159	Rosclogher	Rossinver	Ballyshannon
Sracummer	203	Drumahaire	Killanummery	Manorhamilton
Sradoon	250	Drumahaire	Killanummery	Manorhamilton
Sradrinagh	1,174	Drumahaire	Drumreilly	Carrick on Shannon
Sradrinan	145	Carrigallen	Drumreilly	Bawnboy
Sradrine	262	Drumahaire	Cloonclare	Manorhamilton
Sraduffy	257	Rosclogher	Cloonclare	Manorhamilton
Sragarn	196	Mohill	Mohill	Mohill
Sragarve	29	Rosclogher	Rossinver	Ballyshannon
Sraloaghan	199	Carrigallen	Drumreilly	Bawnboy
Sramore	681	Drumahaire	Drumlease	Manorhamilton
Sranacrannaghy	196	Drumahaire	Killarga	Manorhamilton
Sranadarragh	279	Carrigallen	Drumreilly	Bawnboy
Sranagarvanagh	647	Drumahaire	Drumreilly	Carrick on Shannon
Sranagross	300	Drumahaire	Cloonclare	Manorhamilton
Sranea	77	Rosclogher	Killasnet	Manorhamilton
Sratrissaun North	137	Mohill	Mohill	Mohill
Sratrissaun South	96	Mohill	Mohill	Mohill
Sraud (Conolly)	106	Rosclogher	Rossinver	Ballyshannon
Sraud (Ferguson)	92	Rosclogher	Rossinver	Ballyshannon
Sravrannies	1,144	Drumahaire	Cloonclare	Manorhamilton
Sriff	222	Drumahaire	Drumlease	Manorhamilton
Sruhaun	226	Leitrim	Fenagh	Mohill
Stangaun	139	Drumahaire	Inishmagrath	Manorhamilton
Stonepark	396	Drumahaire	Drumlease	Manorhamilton
Stradermot	125	Carrigallen	Oughteragh	Bawnboy
Stralongford	365	Carrigallen	Oughteragh	Bawnboy
Strandhill (or Lecarrow)	54	Drumahaire	Inishmagrath	Manorhamilton
Stroke	210	Carrigallen	Drumreilly	Bawnboy
Stuck	130	Mohill	Mohill	Mohill
Sunnagh Beg	290	Mohill	Cloone	Mohill
Sunnagh More	1,434	Mohill	Cloone	Mohill
Sunnaghconner	179	Carrigallen	Cloone	Mohill
Sweetwood Little	90	Drumahaire	Killarga	Manorhamilton
Sweetwood Lower	129	Drumahaire	Killarga	Manorhamilton
Sweetwood Upper	95	Drumahaire	Killarga	Manorhamilton
Taash	187	Leitrim	Annaduff	Mohill
Tamlaght Beg	154	Mohill	Mohill	Mohill
Tamlaght More	297	Mohill	Mohill	Mohill
Tamlaghtavally	160	Mohill	Mohill	Mohill
Tawly	1,713	Rosclogher	Rossinver	Ballyshannon
Tawnagh More	272	Mohill	Cloone	Mohill
Tawnahoney	134	Drumahaire	Killarga	Manorhamilton
Tawnaleck	165	Rosclogher	Rossinver	Ballyshannon
Tawnamachugh	575	Rosclogher	Killasnet	Manorhamilton
Tawnycorragh	105	Drumahaire	Inishmagrath	Manorhamilton
Tawnycurry	87	Leitrim	Kiltoghert	Carrick on Shannon
Tawnyeely	35	Mohill	Mohill	Mohill
Tawnyfeacle	509	Rosclogher	Cloonclare	Manorhamilton
Tawnyhoosy	108	Drumahaire	Killarga	Manorhamilton
Tawnylea	193	Drumahaire	Killarga	Manorhamilton
Tawnylust	123	Rosclogher	Cloonclare	Manorhamilton
Tawnylust Barr	135	Rosclogher	Cloonclare	Manorhamilton
Tawnylust Barr Upper	165	Rosclogher	Cloonclare	Manorhamilton
Tawnymanus	272	Drumahaire	Cloonclare	Manorhamilton
Tawnymoyle	613	Rosclogher	Killasnet	Manorhamilton
Tawnytallan	118	Rosclogher	Rossinver	Ballyshannon
Tawnyunshinagh	223	Rosclogher	Cloonclare	Manorhamilton
Tents	178	Drumahaire	Inishmagrath	Manorhamilton
Tinnybeg	71	Drumahaire	Inishmagrath	Manorhamilton
Tirmactiernan	32	Leitrim	Kiltoghert	Carrick on Shannon
Tomloskan	203	Carrigallen	Oughteragh	Bawnboy
Tomrud	209	Rosclogher	Killasnet	Manorhamilton
Tonlegee	844	Drumahaire	Inishmagrath	Manorhamilton
Tonnagh	86	Leitrim	Kiltoghert	Carrick on Shannon
Tooma	240	Mohill	Cloone	Mohill
Tooman	907	Mohill	Cloone	Mohill
Toomans	320	Leitrim	Kiltubbrid	Carrick on Shannon
Toome	332	Carrigallen	Drumreilly	Bawnboy
Townparks	289	Leitrim	Kiltoghert	Carrick on Shannon
Trawnish Island	2	Drumahaire	Cloonclare	Manorhamilton
Trean	208	Mohill	Cloone	Mohill
Treanakillew	630	Rosclogher	Killasnet	Manorhamilton
Treanmore	170	Mohill	Mohill	Mohill
Treannadullagh	177	Drumahaire	Killarga	Manorhamilton
Tuckmillpark	26	Drumahaire	Cloonclare	Manorhamilton
Tulcon	570	Mohill	Cloone	Mohill
Tulcon	198	Leitrim	Mohill	Mohill
Tullaghan	120	Rosclogher	Rossinver	Ballyshannon
Tullaghans	151	Drumahaire	Inishmagrath	Manorhamilton
Tullinloughan	238	Drumahaire	Killarga	Manorhamilton
Tullintaggart	106	Rosclogher	Cloonclare	Manorhamilton
Tullintloy	541	Rosclogher	Cloonclare	Manorhamilton
Tullintowell	435	Drumahaire	Inishmagrath	Manorhamilton
Tullinwannia	265	Drumahaire	Killarga	Manorhamilton
Tullinwillin	159	Drumahaire	Killarga	Manorhamilton
Tully	107	Carrigallen	Oughteragh	Bawnboy
Tully	179	Leitrim	Kiltoghert	Carrick on Shannon
Tully	232	Drumahaire	Killanummery	Manorhamilton
Tully	386	Rosclogher	Killasnet	Manorhamilton
Tully	212	Leitrim	Fenagh	Mohill
Tully North	244	Carrigallen	Carrigallen	Bawnboy
Tully South	515	Carrigallen	Carrigallen	Mohill
Tullybradan	444	Mohill	Mohill	Mohill
Tullyclevaun	311	Drumahaire	Inishmagrath	Manorhamilton
Tullycoly	161	Drumahaire	Killanummery	Manorhamilton
Tullycorka	381	Drumahaire	Inishmagrath	Manorhamilton
Tullycreevy	80	Drumahaire	Killarga	Manorhamilton
Tullydeerin	161	Rosclogher	Rossinver	Manorhamilton
Tullylackan Beg	125	Carrigallen	Oughteragh	Bawnboy
Tullylackan More	141	Carrigallen	Oughteragh	Bawnboy
Tullylannan	264	Leitrim	Kiltoghert	Carrick on Shannon
Tullymurray	329	Drumahaire	Inishmagrath	Manorhamilton
Tullynacross	80	Drumahaire	Killarga	Manorhamilton
Tullynahaia	1,555	Drumahaire	Drumreilly	Carrick on Shannon
Tullynamoyle	644	Drumahaire	Killarga	Manorhamilton
Tullynamuckduff	190	Drumahaire	Inishmagrath	Manorhamilton
Tullynapurtlin	216	Drumahaire	Drumreilly	Carrick on Shannon
Tullynaroog	77	Drumahaire	Inishmagrath	Manorhamilton
Tullynascreen	1,035	Drumahaire	Killanummery	Manorhamilton
Tullynasharragh	145	Drumahaire	Killarga	Manorhamilton
Tullynasharragh	46	Rosclogher	Killasnet	Manorhamilton
Tullyoran	97	Mohill	Cloone	Mohill
Tullyoran	81	Mohill	Mohill	Mohill
Tullyoscar	116	Carrigallen	Oughteragh	Bawnboy
Tullyskeherny	1,046	Drumahaire	Cloonclare	Manorhamilton
Tullyskeherny	568	Rosclogher	Rossinver	Manorhamilton
Tullyveacan	592	Drumahaire	Drumreilly	Carrick on Shannon
Tullyveame	69	Drumahaire	Inishmagrath	Manorhamilton
Tullywana	263	Carrigallen	Oughteragh	Bawnboy
Tulrusk	167	Mohill	Mohill	Mohill
Turpaun	63	Drumahaire	Inishmagrath	Manorhamilton
Twigspark	40	Rosclogher	Killasnet	Manorhamilton
Ummera	146	Drumahaire	Inishmagrath	Manorhamilton
Ummera	77	Mohill	Annaduff	Mohill
Unshinagh	337	Rosclogher	Rossinver	Ballyshannon
Unshinagh	51	Carrigallen	Carrigallen	Bawnboy
Unshinagh	164	Carrigallen	Oughteragh	Bawnboy
Unshinagh	48	Drumahaire	Inishmagrath	Manorhamilton
Uragh	985	Rosclogher	Rossinver	Ballyshannon
Urbal	117	Drumahaire	Drumreilly	Carrick on Shannon
Urbal Barr	138	Drumahaire	Drumreilly	Carrick on Shannon
Ussaun	48	Mohill	Mohill	Mohill
Wardhouse	674	Rosclogher	Rossinver	Ballyshannon
Whiterock	29	Carrigallen	Drumreilly	Bawnboy
Woodford Demesne	351	Carrigallen	Carrigallen	Bawnboy
