= Lisduff =

Lisduff may refer to:

== Northern Ireland ==
- Lisduff, County Tyrone, a townland in County Tyrone

== Republic of Ireland ==
- Lisduff, County Cavan, a townland in County Cavan
- Lisduff, County Cork, a region within the village of Whitechurch in County Cork
- Lisduff, County Laois, a townland in County Laois
- Lisduff, County Leitrim, a townland in County Leitrim
- Lisduff, County Westmeath, a townland in the civil parish of Street, barony of Moygoish
