= Aghacashlaun =

Aghacashlaun may refer to:

- Aghacashlaun River, flows into Lough Scur, County Leitrim, Ireland
- Aghacashlaun, a townland in County Leitrim, Ireland; see List of townlands of County Leitrim
