= Mohill =

Town in County Leitrim, Connacht, Ireland

Mohill Maothail
- Town
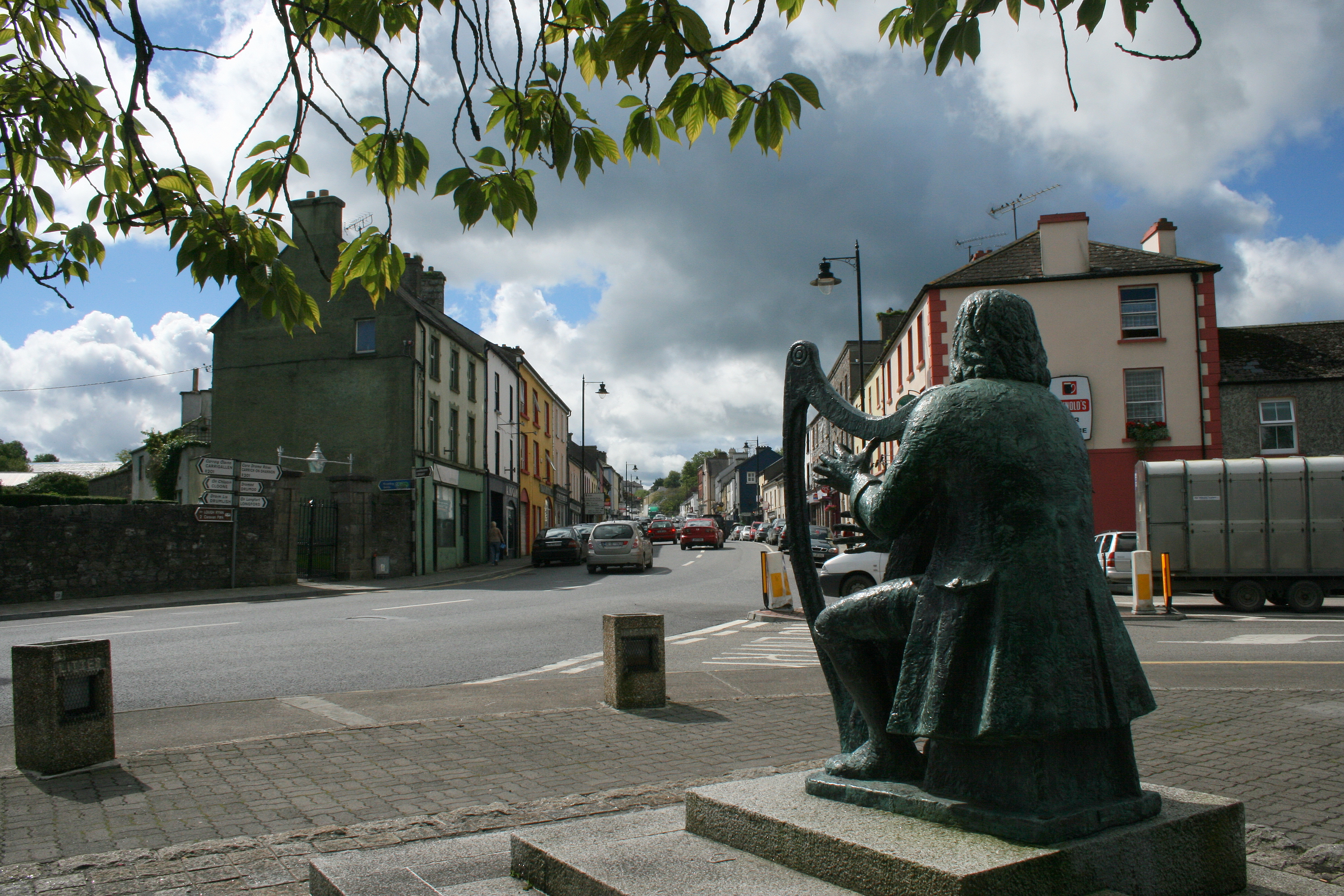
- Statue of the blind harpist Turlough O'Carolan in Mohill

- Location in Ireland
- Coordinates: 53.922°N 7.866°W
- Country: Ireland
- Province: Connacht
- County: County Leitrim
- Barony: Mohill
- Elevation: 82 m (269 ft)

Population (2022)
  - Total: 1,027
- Irish Grid Reference: N088963

Mohill (Irish: Maothail, meaning "soft ground") is a small town in the south of County Leitrim in Ireland. The town of Carrick-on-Shannon is approximately 16 km (10 miles) away.

== History ==
The Justinian plague of Mohill devastated the local population in the 6th century. Mohill, or Maothail Manachain, is named for St. Manachan, who founded the Monastery of Mohill-Manchan here c. 500–538 AD. Some sources and folklore say the shrine of Manchan was kept at the Monastery of Mohill-Manchan, before being moved to Lemanaghan in county Offaly for some unrecorded reason. The Monastery was taken over by Augustinians in the 13th century and was later closed in the 16th century, after the time of King Henry VIII. The site of the church is now occupied by a Church of Ireland church and graveyard.

Ownership of the town passed to the Crofton family during the plantations and areas around the town were owned by the Clements family (Lord Leitrim), who built the nearby Lough Rynn estate and was also the owner of what is now Áras an Uachtaráin (Viceregal Lodge, Dublin). Mohill Poor Law Union was formed 12 September 1839 and covered an area of 215 square miles (560 km^{2}). The population falling within the union at the 1831 census had been 66,858. The new workhouse, built in 1840–42, occupied a 6-acre (24,000 m^{2}) site and was designed to accommodate 700 inmates. During the great famine, Anthony Trollope wrote a voyeuristic narrative on Mohill in his novel The Macdermots of Ballycloran, an early work.

By 1856, Slater's Directory described Mohill as a prosperous, thriving market town stating that it contained "several good shops well-stocked with the various articles of fashion and of local requisites. Great progress is manifest in its general appearance and of its size is considered one of the most stirring, and is certainly the most thriving town of any in the surrounding counties".

Hyde Street is named after Rev Arthur Hyde, grandfather of Douglas Hyde, first President of Ireland, who spent part of his childhood in the town. Through at least the 19th and 20th centuries, an impressive number of annual fairs were held at Mohill on: 14 January, February 4, February 25 (Monaghan Day), 8 April, 8 May (or 10 May), 3 June, 1 July, 31 July (or 2 August), 19, 9 and 30 August September, 19 October, 11 November, and 2 December. Back in 1925, Mohill town had population of 755 people, and contained 29 houses licensed to sell alcohol.

== Religion ==
The Catholic parish of Mohill also includes the nearby church areas of Eslin and Gorvagh and is administered from St Patrick's Church at the top of the town. The area's Church of Ireland church is located at the bottom (east) of the town, where the Augustinian Monastery once stood.

== Transport ==
The town was served by the narrow-gauge Cavan and Leitrim Railway, which closed in 1959. Mohill railway station opened on 24 October 1887 and finally closed on 1 April 1959.

The R201 regional road runs through the centre of the town, as does the R202. The nearest station is Dromod railway station on the Dublin–Sligo railway line. Mohill is served four times daily Monday to Saturday by the Locallink Ballinamore to Carrick on Shannon bus service which also gives two daily connections to Dromod.

== Sport ==
The parish of Mohill currently has two Gaelic Football Clubs: Mohill GAA club, which plays in Division One, and Eslin GAA, which is a Division Two team. Mohill GAA club also fields teams in Divisions 3 and 5, whilst Eslin field their second team in Division 5. Both clubs have won Senior titles in the past, and Mohill Faugh-an-Bealaghs won the first-ever Leitrim Championship in 1890, defeating Ballinamore in the final. Eslin won their first title the following year by defeating Mohill in the final. Eslin won the last of their three titles in 1917 but have won several Junior Championships in the meantime. Mohill won the last of their five Senior titles in 2006. Mohill and Eslin sometimes amalgamate for underage competition under the name St. Manachans, named after the patron saint of the parish.

The former Mohill clubman and Leitrim inter-county footballer, Packy McGarty, was born in Mohill. He played for his county over four decades from 1949 to 1973.

A former club in the parish, representing Gorvagh, won several titles in the 1920s, including "four in a row" between 1924 and 1928. The top scorer on the Leitrim team in the late 1950s and 1960s was Cathal Flynn who was born in Gorvagh and formed a partnership with Packy McGarty during this period.

Mohill has a basketball club. The bascketball club's Under 16 Girls team won the national title at the 2008 Community Games.

Mohill is also home to the South Leitrim Harriers who hunt throughout the winter in the surrounding countryside.

== Education ==
Primary schools in the area include St. Manchan's National School (an amalgamation of St. Joseph's Girls National School and St. Michael's Boys National School which opened in 2005) and the Hunt National School.

The local secondary school, Mohill Community College (Irish: Coláiste Pobail Maothail), opened in 2008.

== Services ==
Mohill Fire Station has nine retained personnel, with one Scania Class B appliance and one Dennis Class B Appliance. Mohill responds to on average 70 calls per year with 10% RTC's.

== People ==
Mohill is closely associated with Turlough Carolan, the blind harpist, who lived in the town after his marriage. Douglas Hyde, the first President of Ireland, whose family originated from the town, also spent some of his childhood there. Thomas Moran from Drumrahill, near the town, was a renowned 20th-century ballad singer whose songs were collected by the BBC.

Archdeacon Charles Reynolds, the prominent cleric, was born and reared at Saint Mary's Priory of Mohill; he was a leading figure in the 1535 Irish clerical revolt against Henry VIII. Reynolds was attainted of treason in 1536, for persuading the Pope to excommunicate Henry VIII of England.

== Townlands ==
Townlands in the area include:

- Breandrum
- Eslinbridge
- Gorvagh
- Mohill
- Shannagh
- Treanmore

== See also ==
- List of towns and villages in Ireland
