= Mohill Community College =

Secondary school in Ireland

Coordinates: 53.9228°N 7.8723°W

- Coláiste Pobhail Maothail
- Mohill, County Leitrim; Ireland

Information
- Religious affiliation: various
- Established: September 2008
- Principal: Cormac Flynn
- Enrollment: 390 (2021)
- Area: 5000 m^{2}
- Website: http://mohillcommunitycollege.ie

Mohill Community College is a secondary school in Mohill, Ireland. It is a community school, formed from the merger of two existing local schools.

== History ==
Before the school opened in September 2008, (Note: Official college opening was in 2010.) there were two secondary schools in the town, Mohill Vocational School (sometimes known as the tec) and Marian College (sometimes known as the convent). The two schools amalgamated in 2008 to form Mohill Community College. Since its opening the school has been a mixed school. Úna Duffy retired after 15 years as principal in 2023.

== Sports ==
The school has an astro turf pitch, a basketball court, a tennis court, and a GAA pitch. It has a GAA team, a soccer team, and a basketball team. There is also a sports hall with a gym at the right end.
