= Eslinbridge =

Eslinbridge Droichead na hEislinne
- Village
- Location in Ireland
- Coordinates: 53°56′19″N 7°55′11″W
- Country: Ireland
- Province: Connacht
- County: County Leitrim
- Elevation: 83 m (272 ft)
- Time zone: UTC+0 (WET)
  - Summer (DST): UTC-1 (IST (WEST))
- Irish Grid Reference: N053987

Eslinbridge, also written as Eslin Bridge (Irish: Droichead na hEislinne), is a settlement in Mohill parish in County Leitrim at the crossroads of L3444 and L3447. Here, the L3444 road crosses Eslin River on a bridge.

The settlement covers parts of the townlands of Cavan, Drumregan, and Tulcon. The community centre of Eslinbridge is located in the latter townland.
