= Cloonsheebane =

Cloonsheebane Cluain Sí Bán
- Townland
- Motto: "The clear or fallow fairy meadow"
- Location in Ireland
- Coordinates: 53°57′30″N 8°05′19″W
- Country: Ireland
- Province: Connacht
- County: County Leitrim
- Time zone: UTC+0 (WET)
  - Summer (DST): UTC-1 (IST (WEST))
- Irish Grid Reference: M941997

Cloonsheebane (Irish: Cluain Sí Bán, meaning 'The clear or fallow fairy meadow') is a townland in County Leitrim, Ireland. Its name derives from the Irish Cluain Sí Bán, Cluain meaning "meadow," Sí meaning "fairy", while Bán means "white", and in this context it means clear or fallow. Cloonsheebane is part of Carrick-on-Shannon. The road from Carrick-on-Shannon to Cootehall passes through the townland. It borders Cloonsheerevagh townland.
