= Cathal Flynn =

Irish Gaelic footballer (1934–2021)

Personal information
- Native name: Cathal Ó Floinn (Irish)
- Born: 1934 Gorvagh, County Leitrim, Ireland
- Died: 3 June 2021 (aged 87) Blanchardstown, Dublin, Ireland
- Occupation: Accountant

Sport
- Sport: Gaelic Football
- Position: Full-forward
Clubs
- Years: Club
- Gorvagh; Seán McDermotts
Club titles
- Leitrim titles: 0
Inter-county
- Years: County
- 1952-1966: Leitrim
Inter-county titles
- Connacht titles: 0
- All-Irelands: 0
- NFL: 0
- All Stars: 0

Cathal Flynn (1934 – 3 June 2021) was an Irish Gaelic footballer who played for club sides Gorvagh and Seán McDermotts and at inter-county level with the Leitrim senior football team. He usually lined out as a forward.

== Career ==
Born in Gorvagh, County Leitrim, Flynn first came to Gaelic football prominence when he won a Leinster Colleges Championship title with the Franciscan College in Multyfarnham. His two seasons with the Leitrim minor team culminated with him being appointed team captain in 1952. Flynn also joined the Leitrim senior football team that year and began a 14-year senior career that saw him line out in five successive Connacht finals without winning. He was top scorer for the team for 10 years between 1956 and 1966, scoring 40 goals and 356 points. With the Seán McDermotts club in Dublin he won three successive league titles, while he was also selected for Connacht in the Railway Cup.

== Personal life and death ==
Flynn was the only son of Charley Flynn, a national school teacher who had played with the Dublin senior football team for three years. After leaving Gorvagh he worked as an accountant in Dublin before settling in Clonee, County Meath. Flynn died in Connolly Hospital on 3 June 2021.

== Honours ==
Franciscan College

- Leinster Colleges Senior Football Championship: 1952

Seán McDermotts

- Dublin Senior Football League: 1957, 1958, 1959
