= Tullyoran Court Tomb =

Megalithic tomb in County Leitrim, Ireland

Tullyoran Court Tomb is an ancient megalithic tomb near Mohill in County Leitrim, Ireland. It is in the townland of Tullyoran (Irish: Tulaigh Odhráin, meaning 'Odhran's hill'). (Note: The most famous person of this name was Odhran Ua hEolais of Muintir Eolais but a connection is improbable.)

== Townland ==
Tullyoran townland is in the barony of Mohill in County Leitrim. It is located 1.3 kilometres (0.8 mi) east of Mohill, about 1.4 kilometres (0.9 mi) north of the R201 Mohill–Carrigallen road and close to the western edge of a limestone quarry. The land is pasture and meadow with some tillage with trees growing in sheltered locations. The view to the north presents the distant Cuilcagh mountains are visible on the skyline. There is a reported ringfort situated at the centre of the townland. The rock is limestone, light gray, and very fossiliferous.

== Court tomb ==
The ancient "Tullyoran Court tomb" is situated on level pasture land surrounded by drumlins. The monument is badly ruined, consisting of seven set stones and two erect stones, brought together into an irregularly shaped mound, reaching a maximum height of 0.5 metres (1 ft 7.7 in), with a length of 9 metres (29.5 ft) north to south and a width of 5 metres (16.4 ft) east to west. The remains of this Court tomb are interpreted as having an asymmetrical court with one arm curving out and another arm running straight from the entrance.

The three set stones, on the east, might have been part of a curved line of the court. The furthest stone on the east is 0.6 metres (1 ft 11.6 in) long by 0.24 metres (9.4 in) thick, and being only 10 centimetres (3.9 in) high might mean it was the stump of a taller stone. The adjacent stone is 1.05 metres (3 ft 5.3 in) long, by 0.4 metres (1 ft 3.7 in) in thick, and about 0.7 metres (2 ft 3.6 in) in height. The third is a tall pillar-like stone measuring 0.7 metres (2 ft 3.6 in) by 0.5 metres (1 ft 7.7 in) and 0.5 metres (1 ft 7.7 in) in height, perhaps remnants of the entrance to a now destroyed gallery. Opposite, and 0.9 metres (2 ft 11.4 in) to the west, is another stone 1.2 metres (3 ft 11.2 in) long, 0.35 metres (1 ft 1.8 in) thick, and about 1.2 metres (3 ft 11.2 in) in height, which may mark the other side of the supposed entrance.

Southwards from this entrance are three stones, roughly aligned, which might mark the part of the western arm of a court. The stone adjoining the presumed entrance is 0.75 metres (2 ft 5.5 in) in length by 0.3 metres (11.8 in) in thickness and about 0.85 metres (2 ft 9.5 in) in height. After a gap of about 1.2 metres (3 ft 11.2 in) we find the second stone which measures 1.05 metres (3 ft 5.3 in) in length, 0.3 metres (11.8 in) in thickness, and about 0.7 metres (2 ft 3.6 in) in height. The third stone leaning towards the west is tallest, measuring 1.25 metres (4 ft 1.2 in) long by 0.35 metres (1 ft 1.8 in) in thickness and when erect stood 1.4 metres (4 ft 7.1 in) high. A displaced stone about 1 metre (3 ft 3.4 in) wide lies immediately south of this supposed entrance to the gallery and another larger displaced stone about 2.1 metres (6 ft 10.7 in) wide lies on the northern end of the mound. About 17 metres (55.8 ft) to the north-west is a large stone block about 2.35 metres (7 ft 8.5 in) by 1.85 metres (6 ft 0.8 in) and 0.55 metres (1 ft 9.7 in) in thickness, which appears to be unconnected to the main megalith site.

== See also ==
- Monastery of Mohill-Manchan

== References and notes ==
=== Primary sources ===
- de Valera, Ruaidhri; O’Nuallain, Sean (1972). Survey of the Megalithic Tombs of Ireland (PDF). Vol. III. The Stationery Office.

=== Secondary sources ===
- logainm.ie. "Tulaigh Odhráin/Tullyoran".
- townlands.ie. "Tullyoran".
- Kelly, John (1857). On Localities of Fossils of the Carboniferous Limestone of Ireland (PDF). Vol. Journal of the Geological Society of Ireland, Vol. VIII. Royal Geological Society of Ireland, Dublin.
