= Thomas Moran (singer) =

Irish ballad singer

- Born: 1876
- Died: 11 February, 1960 (aged 83–84)
- Occupation: Singer

Thomas Moran (1876 – 11 February 1960) was an Irish ballad singer.

From the townland of Drumraghool North in County Leitrim, Moran was remarkable for his very large repertoire of songs which he could recite from memory. Between 1952 and 1954 the BBC collected and recorded forty-five of his songs. Some of his songs were recorded by Séamus Ennis. Known as "Old Moran, the ballad singer" during his lifetime he sang regularly in nearby Mohill town.

== References and notes ==
=== Primary sources ===
- Slocombe, Marie (1955). "Some "English" Ballads and Folk Songs Recorded in Ireland, 1952-1954". Journal of the English Folk Dance and Song Society. 7 (4, December). English Folk Dance + Song Society: 239–244. JSTOR 4521487.
- Meehan, Christopher (1973). "Thomas Moran: (Mohill), A skilled weaver of fine songs" (PDF). The Leitrim Guardian. Leitrim Guardian: 12.
