= Breandrum =

Townland in County Leitrim, Ireland

Coordinates: 53.978°N 7.907°W

Breandrum (Irish: Brea an droim, meaning 'Fine Ridge') is a townland 4 miles from the town of Mohill in County Leitrim, Ireland. It is situated to the north-west of the town, along the L3052 road to Keshcarrigan. Breandrum Bridge is an old three-arched stone bridge spanning the River Eslin, a tributary of the River Shannon.

The townland consists of two sub-townlands, Breandrum Peyton (Irish: Bréandroim (Peyton)) and Breandrum King (Irish: Bréandroim (King)), the suffixes being the surnames of the past English landowners. Both are part of the civil parish of Mohill. Breandrum (King) has an area of 0.16 square miles (0.4071 km²), Breandrum (Peyton) an area of 0.27 square miles (0.7087 km²)
