= Corthoon =

Townland in County Leitrim, Connacht, Ireland

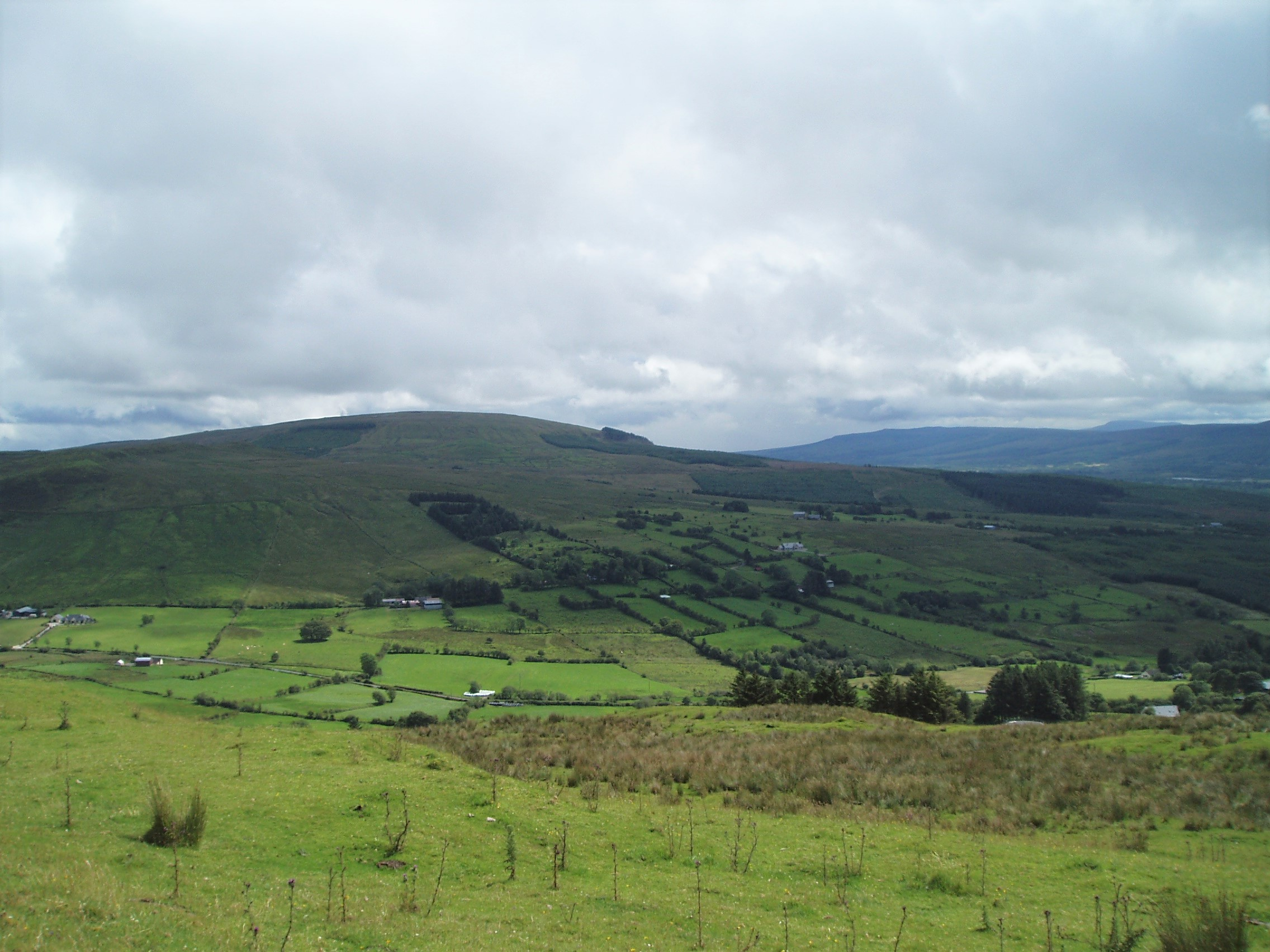
Corthoon viewed from the townland of Brackary More

Corthoon or Cartrongibbagh is a townland in County Leitrim, Connacht, Ireland. The townland is located in the northern part of the county, close to the borders of County Donegal and County Fermanagh. The main service town is Manorhamilton.

Corthoon covers a 140.19 ha (346.4 acres) area and is the 310th largest townland (out of a total of 1508) in County Leitrim. Nationally, it is the 1,952nd largest townland.

Corthoon falls within the Electoral Division of Ballaghameehan, the Civil Parish of Rossinver, in the Barony of Rosclogher. It is the most southerly townland in the parish of Rossinver.

Corthoon borders the following other townlands:

- Brackary Beg to the west
- Brackary More to the west
- Faughary to the south
- Kinkillew to the north
- Shasmore to the east

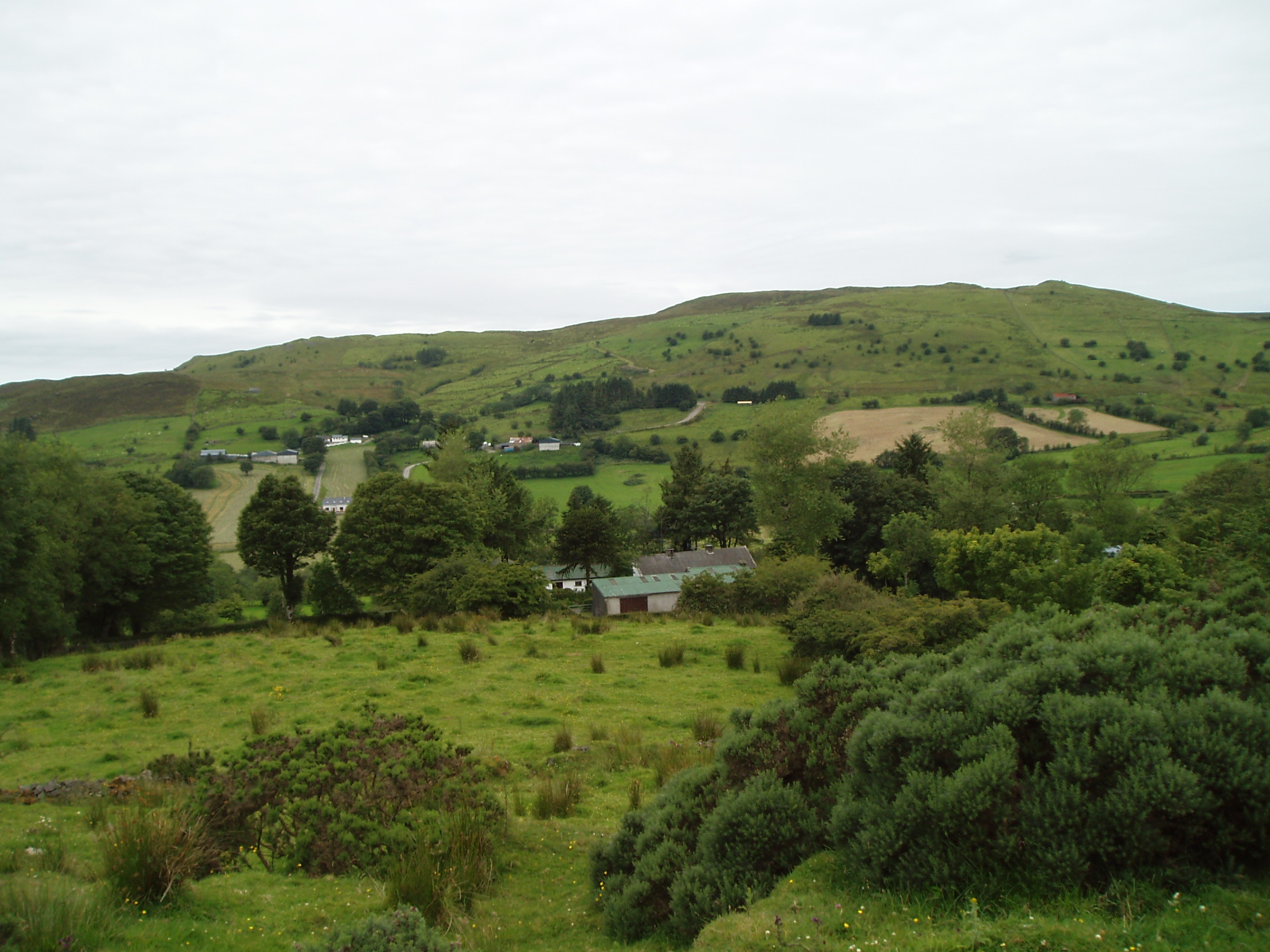
Corthoon looking West to Brackary More

== Geography ==
The Owenbeg river forms a boundary on the west with Brackary More and Brackary Beg. The Owenbeg river joins the Owenmore river in Manorhamilton. The Owenmore is a tributary of the Bonet river, one of the major rivers of North Leitrim which has its headwaters in Glenade Lough and drains into Lough Gill in County Sligo.

Main hills and mountains located in and bordering the townland are situated to the East and North and include White Hill in Corthoon, Shasmore mountain in Shasmore and Saddle Hill in Faughry.

== History ==
At the base of White Hill was located the site of a Mass rock known locally as Archies Rock.

Brackary School opened in 1897 was the local primary school until its closure in 1973 when all students and teachers moved to the local Largy National school near Glenade Lough.

Bulmer Hobson is known to have visited the townland.

The main industry is farming, predominantly beef farming and some sheep farming. Cattle milk production was common until the 1970s but this was gradually phased out following Ireland’s entry into the EEC. Milk produced in the townland was transported to the local creamery, the Killasnett Co-op, in Manorhamiltion.

The most common family names in the townland are Meehan, McGurrin and McDermott.

== Transport ==
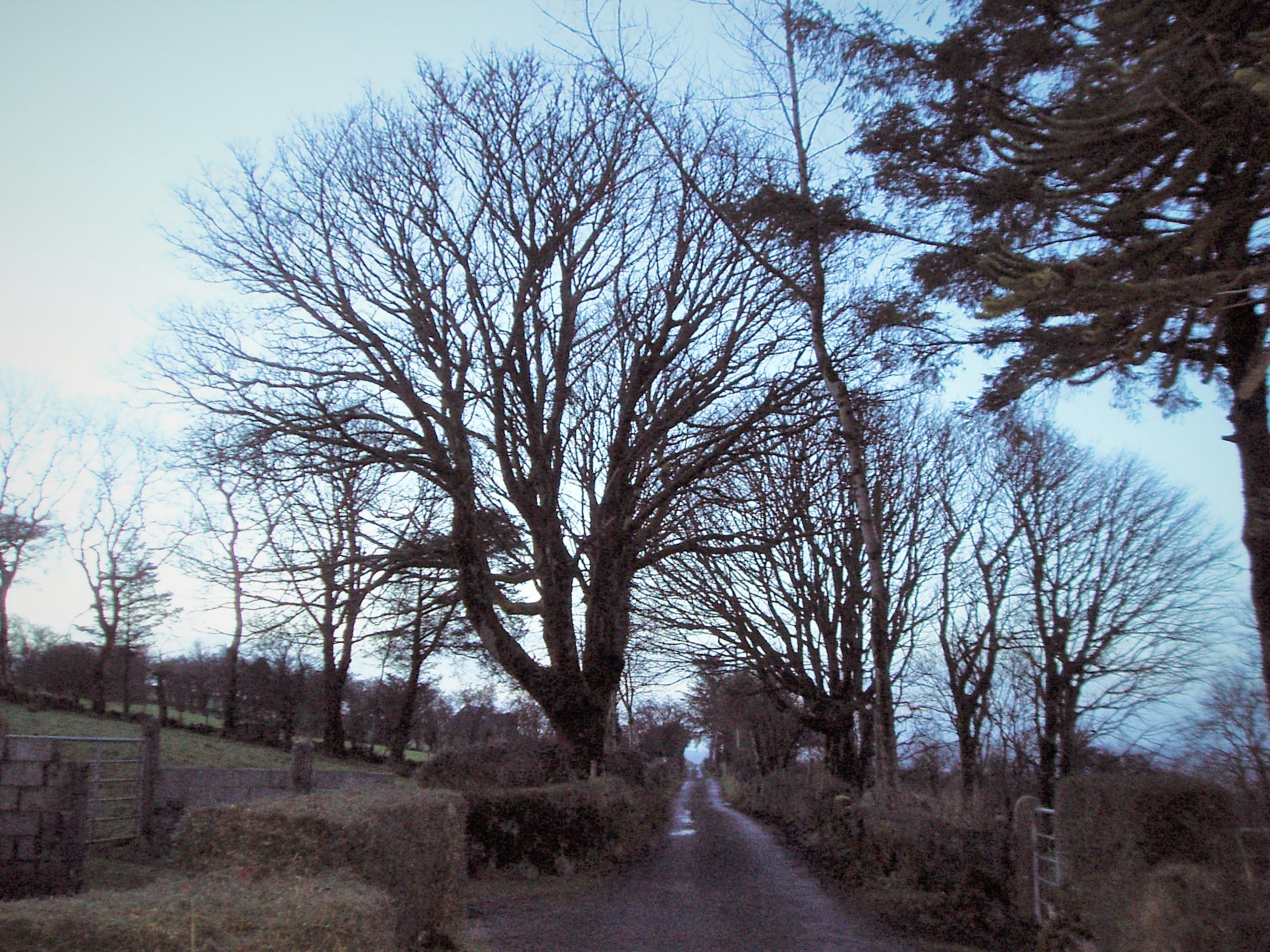
Road L6180 at Corthoon heading south towards Manorhamilton

The townland is serviced by the L6180 road which branches off the R282 road near the border of Corthoon and the townland of Shasmore.

The L6180 continues through the townland and rejoins the R282 in the townland of Skreeny Manor near Manorhamilton.

The R282 road is a regional road connecting the N16 road (Ireland) in Manorhamilton with Rossinver and further links with the R281 to Kinlough and Glenfarne.

Corthoon is 4.77 km (2.96 mi) north of Manorhamilton, via the L6180 and R282.

Corthoon is 5 km (3.1 mi) south of St Aidans Catholic Church, Ballaghameehan in Rossinver Parish via the R282 and L6180.
