= Lisduff, County Cork =

Lisduff An Lios Dubh
- Townland
- Location in Ireland
- Coordinates: 51°33′40″N 08°55′57″W
- Country: Ireland
- Province: Munster
- County: County Cork
- Time zone: UTC+0 (WET)
  - Summer (DST): UTC-1 (IST (WEST))

Lisduff (Irish: Lios Dubh, meaning 'black fort') is a townland in County Cork, Ireland. Historical records list Lisduffe from the Down Survey dated 1655. The Record of Monuments and Places contains two entries in the Lisduff area; a millstone and a ringfort.

== Ringfort ==
The ringfort is described as a circular area approximately 34 meters in diameter defined by a 1.7 meter scarp with the interior rising towards centre. Damage to the southwest portion can be viewed from satellite imagery.
