= Cloonsheerevagh =

Coordinates: 53.968°N 8.078°W

Cloonsheerevagh Cluain Sí Riabhach
- Townland
- Interactive map of Cloonsheerevagh
- Country: Ireland
- County: Leitrim
- Civil Parish: Kiltoghert

Cloonsheerevagh (Irish: Cluain Sí Riabhach: "speckled fairy meadow") is a townland in Carrick-on-Shannon in County Leitrim, Ireland. It is 54.6 acres (0.2 km^{2}) in area.

Cloonsheerevagh's neighbouring townlands include Cloonsheebane, Hartley, Caldragh, and Cartown.
