= Gorvagh =

Townland in County Leitrim, Ireland

Coordinates: 53°58′49.01″N 07°51′25.99″W

Gorvagh or Garvagh (Irish: Garbhach) is a townland in County Leitrim, Ireland. It is located approximately 4 miles (6.4 km) from Mohill and 6 miles (9.7 km) from Ballinamore. It belongs to the barony and parish of Mohill with St. Joseph's Church situated on a hill overlooking the main Mohill Ballinamore road (R202) which traverses the area.

Gorvagh is known for its lakes, in which fishing is undertaken by locals and tourists. Fenagh Abbey is 3 miles (4.8 km) from Gorvagh.
