= Fenagh, County Leitrim =

Village in County Leitrim, Ireland

Fenagh Fíonach
- Village
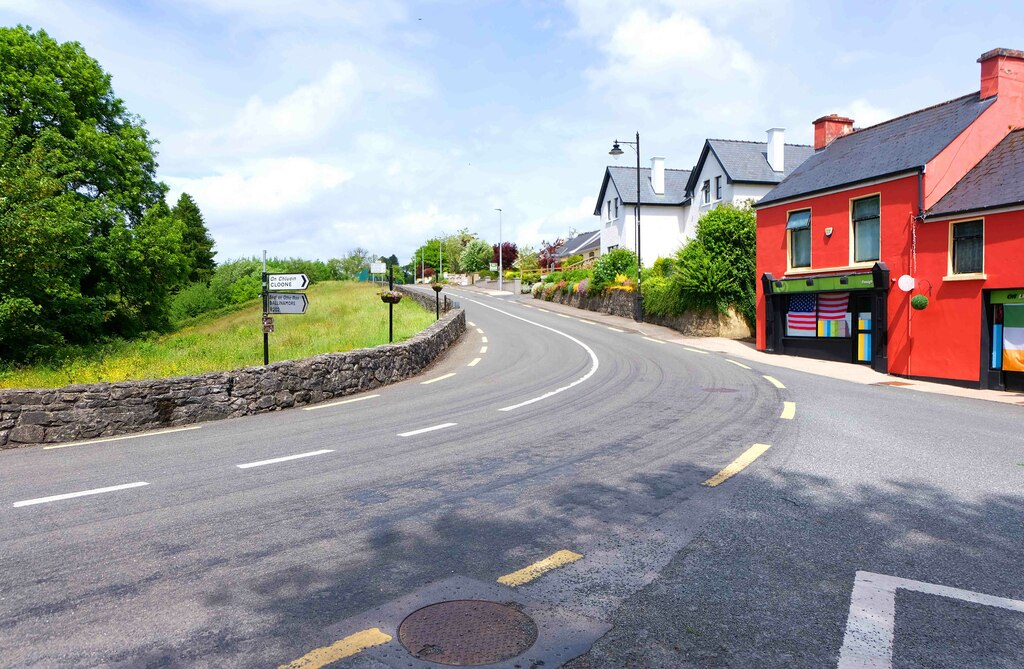
- R202 road in Fenagh

- Location in Ireland
- Coordinates: 54°01′15″N 7°50′01″W
- Country: Ireland
- Province: Connacht
- County: County Leitrim
- Barony: Leitrim
- Time zone: UTC+0 (WET)
  - Summer (DST): UTC-1 (IST (WEST))
- Website: www.fenagh.com

Fenagh (Irish: Fiodhnach or Fíonach, meaning 'woody place') is a village in the south-east of County Leitrim in Ireland. It is 5 km (3 mi) south-west of Ballinamore and 12 km (7 mi) north of Mohill, the village being on the R202 road. The village is in a civil parish of the same name. Fenagh is located in the eastern 'spur' of the Barony of Leitrim.

== History ==
The area was the site of the Battle of Fidhnacha (Fenagh) in 1094.

Fenagh Abbey is one of the oldest monastic sites in Ireland, believed to date back to the earliest period of Celtic monasticism. The founder was St. Caillín, thought to have arrived in Fenagh from Dunmore in County Galway in the 5th century (according to the Book of Fenagh). The Abbey had a monastic school, and was "celebrated for its divinity school, which was resorted to by students from every part of Europe".

Magnus, son of Muirchertach Muimnech (from the Annals of Connacht), wrote in 1244:

Fedlimid mac Cathail Chrobdeirg made an immense hosting eastwards into Brefne against O Raigillig, to avenge his fosterson and kinsman, Tadc O Conchobair. They encamped for a night at Fenagh. At that time there was no roof on the church of Fenagh, and the coarb was away that night. And as he was not present, the common soldiers of the host burned the huts and tents which were inside the church, without permission of their leaders, and the coarb's foster-child, God's gift, was suffocated. Now learned men relate that the coarb received this foster-child by finding him on a large stone which stood in that place, and [the people] never knew of his having either mother or father; and the coarb loved him and gave him, as it is said, milk from his own breasts. Next day he came to them in anger and indignation at the death of the boy, requiring O Conchobair to pay the blood-fine for his foster-child, and O Conchobair said he could choose what fine he pleased. 'I choose' said he 'the best man among you, as compensation for the child of God whom you have burnt.' 'That' said O Conchobair 'is Magnus, the son of Muirchertach Muimnech.' 'Nay, not so,' said Magnus 'but he who is leader of the host.' 'I will not go from you so' said the coarb 'until I get the fine for my foster-child.' After this the host departed from that place, and the coarb followed them to Ath na Cuirre on the Yellow River, which was flowing over its banks, so that they could not cross it till they broke up the spital-house of John the Baptist, which stood beside the ford, (Note: Ath na Cuirre on the Yellow River and the spital-house of John the Baptist, which stood beside the ford refer to Ballinamore) and used its materials to bridge the river for the host to pass across. Magnus son of Muirchertach Muimnech and Conchobar son of Cormac Mac Diarmata went into the house, and Magnus spoke to a man who was above him, at work on the house-breaking; 'That' said he, pointing upwards with the chape of his sword, 'is the nail which keeps the house from falling.' As he spoke, a rafter(?) fell on his head and smashed it to pieces on the spot. He was buried outside the doorway of the church of Fenagh, and thrice the capacity of the Bell of the Kings of silver and thirty horses were given as an offering with him. Thus, then, did the coarb of St. Caillin at last recover compensation for his fosterling of God from them. A beautiful monument of carved stone with an excellently wrought stone cross was afterwards made [and set up] over him, but after a while the Ui Ruairc in their enmity demolished it.

== Rail transport ==
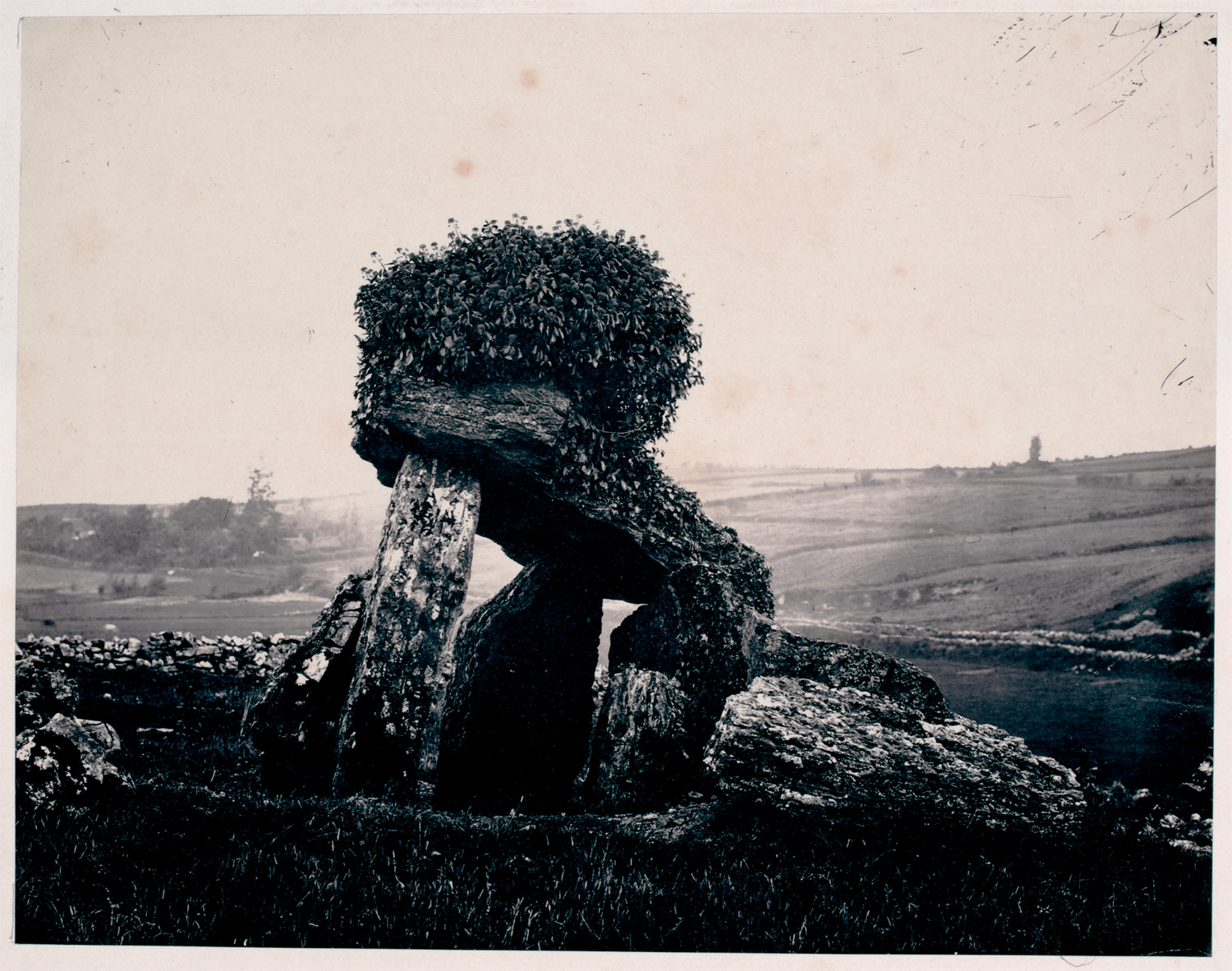
The Dolmen at Fenagh, c.1858

Fenagh railway station opened on 24 October 1887 and closed on 1 April 1959. It was part of the narrow-gauge Cavan and Leitrim Railway from Belturbet to Dromod, with a line to Arigna from Ballinamore.

== Fenagh Abbey ==
At Fenagh, two church ruins stand on the site of an earlier monastery founded by St. Caillin in the 6th century. The main ruins of the Gothic church have (among other features) an east window of unusual design and a relief-carved 17th-century penal cross. A number of standing stones in the vicinity represent the petrified bodies of druids who tried to expel St. Caillin from Fenagh. There are a number of other prehistoric remains located in or near the village. A portal tomb at the north of the village is said to be the burial place of King Conall Gulban. 19 Gaelic kings are said to be buried in the graveyard. There was also a divinity school at Fenagh. It is believed that community life continued until 1652, when Cromwellian soldiers sacked it. It was damaged by cannon fire during the Williamite wars in 1690, and the last service was said in 1729. The site is on the northern shore of Fenagh Lough.

== Book of Fenagh ==
The Book of Fenagh was completed at the monastery in 1516, and a copy is now kept at the Royal Irish Academy. It was written in Irish, and contains verse and prose of the "life" of St Caillin of Fenagh transcribed and translated from the, now lost, Old Book of St. Caillin. The original Old Book of St. Caillin apparently "only contained prose" but the Book of Fenagh / Leabar Chaillín / Leabar Fidhnacha of 1516, contained both prose and verse. Some poems relevant to the politics of 11th-13th-century Tyrconnell, are thought to date from an earlier period than the rest of the manuscript.

The Book of Fenagh, in Irish and English, is available to read for free.

== Notable residents ==
- John McGahern (1934–2006), writer from nearby Ballinamore who lived, wrote and farmed in the townland of Aughaboneill, immediately south of Foxfield and just south-west of Fenagh, for the last 30 years of his life. Much of his inspiration for Amongst Women, That They May Face the Rising Sun and Memoir comes from the area.
- John Ellis, former politician

== See also ==
- List of towns and villages in the Republic of Ireland

== Notes and references ==
=== Sources ===
- Ayres, Bob (1997). "Fenagh station" (PDF). Railscot - Irish Railways. p. 28.
- Costello, Michael A.; Coleman, Ambrose; Flood, William Henry Grattan (1909). De annatis Hiberniae: a calendar of the first fruits' fees levied on papal appointments to benefices in Ireland A.D. 1400 to 1535 (PDF). Dundalk : Printed and published by W. Tempest.
- Hennessy, W. M.; Kelly, D. H. (1875). W. M. Hennessy; D. H. Kelly (eds.). "The Book of Fenagh in Irish and English, Originally compiled by St. Caillin". Internet Archive is a non-profit library of millions of free books, and more.
- Ó Donnabháin, Sean (1828). Book of Fenagh, Translation and Copious Notes (PDF). Fenagh, Leitrim, Ireland: Maolmhordha Mac Dubhghoill Uí Raghailligh.
- Monks of Caillín, Caillín (1300–1350). old Book of St Caillín / Leabar Chaillín (no longer extant). Fenagh, Leitrim, Ireland: Ó Rodaighe. Archived from the original on 27 May 2021.
- Mac Phaidín Uí Mhaoil Chonaire, Muirgheas (1516). Book of Fenagh / Leabar Chaillín / Leabar Fidhnacha. Fenagh, Leitrim, Ireland: Tadhg Ó Rodaighe. Archived from the original on 27 May 2021.
- Simms, Katharine (2008). "Ériu: The Donegal Poems in the Book of Fenagh". Ériu. 58 (Vol. 58 ed.). Royal Irish Academy: 37–53. doi:10.3318/ERIU.2008.58.37. JSTOR 20696361. S2CID 154477145. (subscription required)
- Walsh, Dennis (2010). "O'Rourke Family Genealogy and History". rootsweb.ancestry.com.
