= The Barracks (novel) =

Book by John McGahern

- First edition
- Author: John McGahern
- Language: English
- Publisher: Faber and Faber
- Publication date: 1963
- Publication place: Ireland
- Media type: Print (hardcover and paperback)
- Pages: 232 (first edition)
- ISBN: 0-571-11990-5 (1st ed.); 0-14-200425-1 (new hardcover)
- OCLC: 12478315

The Barracks is the debut novel of Irish writer John McGahern (1934–2006). Critically acclaimed when it was published in 1963, it won the AE Memorial Award from the Arts Council of Ireland and the Macauley Fellowship.

The Barracks is set in a police barracks similar to the one McGahern lived in with his father from the age of ten, after his mother's death from breast cancer. The narrator and central character is Elizabeth Reegan, a young woman who had worked as a nurse in London for two years during the Blitz. She then marries a widower police officer with three children and lives in the Irish village where she had been raised. She is unhappy with her new life and depressed. She discovers that she is dying of breast cancer, as McGahern's mother had.

The generous Macauley Fellowship McGahern received for The Barracks allowed him to take a year's sabbatical from his job as a teacher. During this year he travelled and lived in London, Spain, France, and Germany, finished his second novel The Dark, worked as a labourer and barman, and married Annikki Laaksi, a Finnish theatre director. The Dark was published in 1965, and caused McGahern's fame in Ireland to become notoriety when it was banned under the Censorship Act because of its themes of parental and clerical child abuse.

The Barracks was adapted for the stage by Hugh Leonard for the 1969 Dublin Theatre Festival.

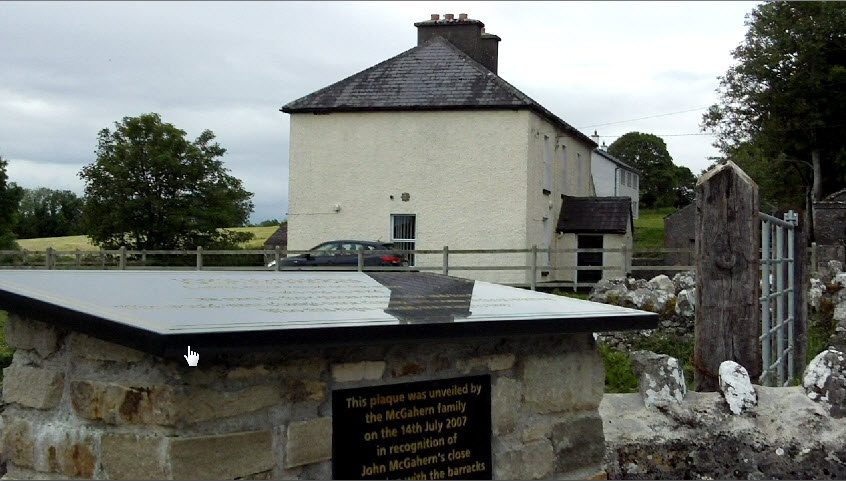
The Barracks, Cootehall, County Roscommon and John McGahern memorial plaque
