= Amongst Women =

Novel by John McGahern

- 1st edition hardback cover of Amongst Women
- Author: John McGahern
- Cover artist: Sam McConnell
- Language: English
- Publisher: Faber and Faber
- Publication date: 1990 (1st edition)
- Publication place: Republic of Ireland
- Media type: Print (hardback & paperback)
- Pages: 184 pages (hardback 1st edition)
- ISBN: 0-571-14284-2 (hardback 1st edition)
- OCLC: 22732561
- Dewey Decimal: 823/.914 20
- LC Class: PR6063.A2176 A8 1990b

Amongst Women is a novel by the Irish writer John McGahern (1934–2006). McGahern's best known novel, it is also considered his greatest work.

Published by Faber and Faber, the novel tells the story of Michael Moran, a bitter, ageing Irish Republican Army (IRA) veteran, and his tyranny over his wife and children, who both love and fear him. It was shortlisted for the 1990 Booker Prize and won The Irish Times/Aer Lingus Literary Award in 1991.

== Plot introduction ==
The novel is set in County Leitrim in the rural border region of the Republic of Ireland. The story spans a period of twenty years in the middle of the twentieth century. It centres on Michael Moran, patriarch of the Moran family and a former IRA member who was an officer and guerrilla fighter in the War of Independence and the Irish Civil War in the 1920s. Although Moran is a well-respected member of his community and a devout Catholic, there is a cruel, violent, and controlling side to his character. He dominates the lives of his second wife, Rose, and his five children. His children strive to establish their own lives while remaining loyal to the family. Most of the story is told through the use of flashbacks, as Moran's daughters attempt to recreate Monaghan Day for their elderly and depressed father, because it was the day when he always seemed to be at his best.

== Explanation of the novel's title ==
The title can be interpreted in two ways. Firstly, the title refers to Moran's largely female household, with much of the book focusing on the domineering relationship between the patriarchal Moran and the women surrounding him. The title also references the traditional prayer, the Hail Mary, which contains the clause "blessed art thou amongst women". This prayer is significant as it is part of the Rosary, which is prayed every day in the Moran household, and the event is a repeating motif throughout the novel.

== Plot summary ==
The novel opens with an elderly, weak, and depressed Michael Moran being taken care of by his daughters. Although they have busy lives and families of their own in Dublin and London, they have never really left the family home because they feel more important there. They have decided to recreate Monaghan Day, an event Moran always seemed to enjoy, hoping that this will somehow reverse his failing health. Monaghan Day was a market day, when Moran's friend McQuaid used to visit and they would reminisce about the war. The family's story is told through the use of flashbacks as the women in Moran's life remember the past.

Moran was a once prominent Republican who fought for Irish independence in the 1920s. He is now a widower with three daughters and two sons. They live in a house called "Great Meadow" on a small farm in the west of Ireland. He thinks that his time in the IRA was the best of his life, and misses the security provided by the military's structure, rules, and clear demarcation of power. In his old age, however, he is bitter about the "small-minded gangsters" that are now in charge of the Republic of Ireland. For example, he refuses his soldier's pension because he feels that the government has betrayed the ideals that he fought for in his youth. He transfers the violent nature that served him well in battle to his dealings with his family.

Moran's controlling nature is shown from the very first flashback narrative. On a past Monaghan Day, Moran petulantly refuses to yield to McQuaid's authority, "an authority that had outgrown" his own. McQuaid leaves abruptly and ends their long friendship. This is a defining moment for Moran, after which he withdraws into "that larger version of himself", his family, over which he exercises absolute authority. Through his influence, the outside world is kept at an "iron distance", and the family unite against it.

Moran marries a local woman called Rose Brady when his children are teenagers. Rose is in middle-age when she marries Moran. Despite her mother's warning that he is "one sort of person when he's out in the open among people – he can be very sweet – but that he's a different sort of person altogether behind the walls of his own house," she is determined to marry him. She becomes a mother to the children and is their mainstay. For example, she helps Maggie to leave for London to become a nurse. She often alleviates the disputes between Moran and the children. She is quietly tolerant of Moran's mood swings, even when he verbally abuses her.

Moran's personality becomes apparent in his dealings with his family, who all love and respect him despite his violent outbursts and his lack of apologies. His family are actually "inordinately grateful for the slightest good will." Although he can be tender towards his family, he is often obstinate and cruel and demands constant attention. For example, on his wedding day he is content because "he needed this quality of attention to be fixed upon him in order to be completely silent." He enforces his own view of the world on all those around him. He is a devout Catholic and makes sure that his family upholds all the values he fought for. He recites the Rosary daily, looking for religious help for his inner turmoil and the complications of his daily life. His violent nature stems from traumas he received as a guerrilla fighter in his youth. However, he thinks that the war was the best part of his life, because "things were never so simple and clear again."

He feels that he is losing his position as the centre of attention as he ages and the children start to escape from Great Meadow. He demands help and attention at inappropriate times as a way of focusing the others on his needs. Although he is mostly calm with his daughters, he is threatened by his sons as they grow up. Luke, the older son, leaves for London because of his father's overbearing authority and only returns once. Thoughts of Luke are painful to Moran, and the others refrain from mentioning him. Michael, the youngest child, hides behind Rose until he gains the courage to leave also. The only way that the children can assert any autonomy is through exile, thus tacitly rebuking Moran's ethos of family solidarity.

Moran dominates his daughters' lives and they regularly return to the family home despite their own busy lives. They yearn for his approval, yet fear his temper. He tells them that it is important that the family stick together: "Alone we might be nothing. Together we can do anything." They find individuality painful compared to the protection of the familial identity.

Moran's friendship with McQuaid is also recounted using flashbacks, and there is an account of an attack carried out on the British Army by the Flying Column to which they belonged. There is also a description of the argument between them that ended their friendship and left Moran with no male friends.

Moran dies at the end of the novel. He is buried under a yew tree, but his influence does not leave his family "...as they left him under the yew, it was as if each of them in their different ways had become Daddy."

== Characters in Amongst Women ==
- Michael Moran The central character in the novel and patriarch of the Moran family. He has five adult children and is married to Rose, his second wife. A "once powerful man," he is an IRA veteran and a farmer. Although he is a devout and respected man, he is a domestic tyrant. He is bitter about the obsolescence of his body, authority, and the ideals he fought for, and vents his frustration on his family. A complex character, he is unpredictable, obsessed with appearances and lacking in any self-awareness.
- Rose Moran (née Brady) Moran's second wife and stepmother to his children. She is in middle-age when she marries Moran. She had previously worked in Glasgow, Scotland. Although Moran verbally abuses her, she remains loyal to him. She is quiet and patient. She is an integral part of the family and the children's mainstay.
- Luke Moran Moran's eldest child. He is estranged from the family because of his father's violent treatment of him. He lives in London. He communicates with the family by telegram and is informed of his father's death by telegram, but he does not reply or come to the funeral.
- Maggie Moran The eldest daughter. She left home to train as a nurse in England. She lives in London with her husband and children, but regularly returns to Great Meadow.
- Mona Moran Lives in Dublin and works in the civil service. She also returns home frequently.
- Sheila Moran Moran puts a stop to her chance at a university scholarship when she is a teenager. She gets a job in the civil service. She has a husband and children and lives in Dublin.
- Michael Moran Moran's youngest child. He struggles to free himself from the family. When he is younger, he seeks refuge from his father's temper by hiding in the garden. He eventually resists his father and melodramatically leaves and moves to London. However, he does return home at times. He becomes a recognisable, although less severe, version of his father.
- James McQuaid Moran's former lieutenant in the War of Independence, then a successful cattle dealer. He used to pay Moran an annual visit on Monaghan Day. He ends his friendship with Moran because of Moran's intransigent nature.
- Annie & Lizzie Sisters who own and operate the post office

== Major themes ==
The novel is written in quiet and restrained prose, a characteristic of McGahern's writing. The novel is not segmented into chapters. There is not a large amount of plot in the story, with most of the action taking place in flashbacks as the Morans remember the past. There are few dramatic highs and lows and events are paced at the normal tempo of life. All the small details of the Morans' lives gather together to give a powerful story of intergenerational relationships and the need to form connections to the past.

The novel explores the mindset of post-colonial, traditional, Catholic, rural Ireland. Michael says "I'm afraid we might all die in Ireland if we don't get out fast." McGahern asks whether exile offers the only hope for freedom and individuality in this society.

A theme of the novel is the difficulty of communication between a father and his children, which questions Ireland's conceit of itself as a healthy family-centred society. It particularly exposes the insecurities and inexpressiveness of Irish masculinity. McGahern said of the novel: "The whole country is made up of families, each family a kind of independent republic. In Amongst Women, the family is a kind of half-way house between the individual and society." Moran is a man capable of heroic action in a time of revolution, but he is incapable of meeting the demands of domestic and personal intimacy in his fraught and sometimes violent relationships with his wife and children. The question of how to maintain authority over children while still allowing them room to grow is central to the novel.

The novel shows that Moran's contradictory behaviour is a personification of the contradictions of postcolonial society. He typifies the disappointment awaiting the revolutionary who aids the replacement of one power with another without reflecting on the process of domination itself. He vents his sense of betrayal on his family, allowing McGahern to explore how political turmoil can affect families.

The story of the family is an allegory for that of independent Ireland – without the father the family would not exist, but until Moran is dead, the family cannot become itself. The parallel is clearly with Éamon de Valera, though Moran is an Irish Republican legitimist, believing that the only legal government of Ireland was the Second Dáil, and is deeply alienated from the Ireland of de Valera.

Moran lives in a world where Ireland has both achieved nationhood and retreated from the world. Emigration is tolerated as a necessary evil, as it was in Ireland in the 1950s, but the economic failures that drove the mass exodus are never challenged. Moran's death is a moment of liberation for the family.

As the main character, Moran, is never endearing, McGahern challenges the reader to empathise with him and to understand why the women in his life remain emotionally tied to him, even after they have successfully established independent lives away from Great Meadow. Moran's retreat from his youthful exploits in the IRA into a vice-like grip on his household can be seen as a political metaphor, described by one critic as a "A diminished form of home rule." His home Great Meadow stands, like its owner, separate and proud from the landscape. For Moran, it is a domestic fortress where he can retreat from his failures in the outside world.

== Allusions/references to other works ==
Amongst Women refashions characters, themes and situations from The Barracks and The Dark, McGahern's first two novels. For example, Moran resembles the character Mahoney in The Dark and Reegan, the bitter IRA veteran in The Barracks.

McGahern's autobiography Memoir (2005) makes clear the influence of his early life on his work. His much-loved mother Susan died when he was a child, leaving McGahern and his siblings in the care of his father – a former IRA member – who was an authoritarian and self-absorbed Garda (policeman). His complicated character bears a large resemblance to Moran.

== Literary significance & criticism ==
Although McGahern had published four novels and three collections of short stories before Amongst Women, it was this novel that brought his first abundance of critical acclaim. This approval completely shifted the Irish public's reception of his work. Once reviled – he left the country after his novel The Dark (1965) was banned by the Irish Censorship Board because it was deemed pornographic – he became one of Ireland's most eminent writers of fiction.

== Awards and nominations ==
- Booker Prize shortlist (1990)
- Guinness Peat Aviation Award (1990)
  - The judge for that year was John Updike.
- The Irish Times/Aer Lingus Literary Award (1991)

== Adaptations ==
Amongst Women was adapted into a four-part television series for BBC Northern Ireland and RTÉ in 1998. It was directed by Tom Cairns. The screenplay was written by Adrian Hodges. It starred Tony Doyle as Michael Moran, Ger Ryan as Rose, Susan Lynch as Maggie, Geraldine O'Rawe as Mona, Anne-Marie Duff as Sheila and Brían F O'Byrne as Luke. It was nominated for Best Drama Serial at the BAFTA Television Awards and at the Royal Television Society Awards and won Best Television Drama at the Irish Film and Television Awards.

== Fun Facts ==
McGahern was prevented from working as a schoolteacher in the 1960s after The Dark was banned by the Irish Censorship Board. However, Amongst Women is now taught on the syllabus of the Leaving Certificate English course in Irish secondary schools.
