= Pornographer =

A pornographer is a person who produces or publishes pornography.

Pornographer may also refer to:

- The Pornographer (book), a 1979 novel by John McGahern
- The Pornographer (1999 film), an American film directed by Doug Atchison
- The Pornographer (2001 film), a French film directed by Betrand Bonello
- The Pornographers, a 1966 Japanese film directed by Shōhei Imamura

== See also ==
- The New Pornographers, a Canadian rock band
