= List of awards and nominations received by Andrew Scott =

Andrew Scott awards and nominations
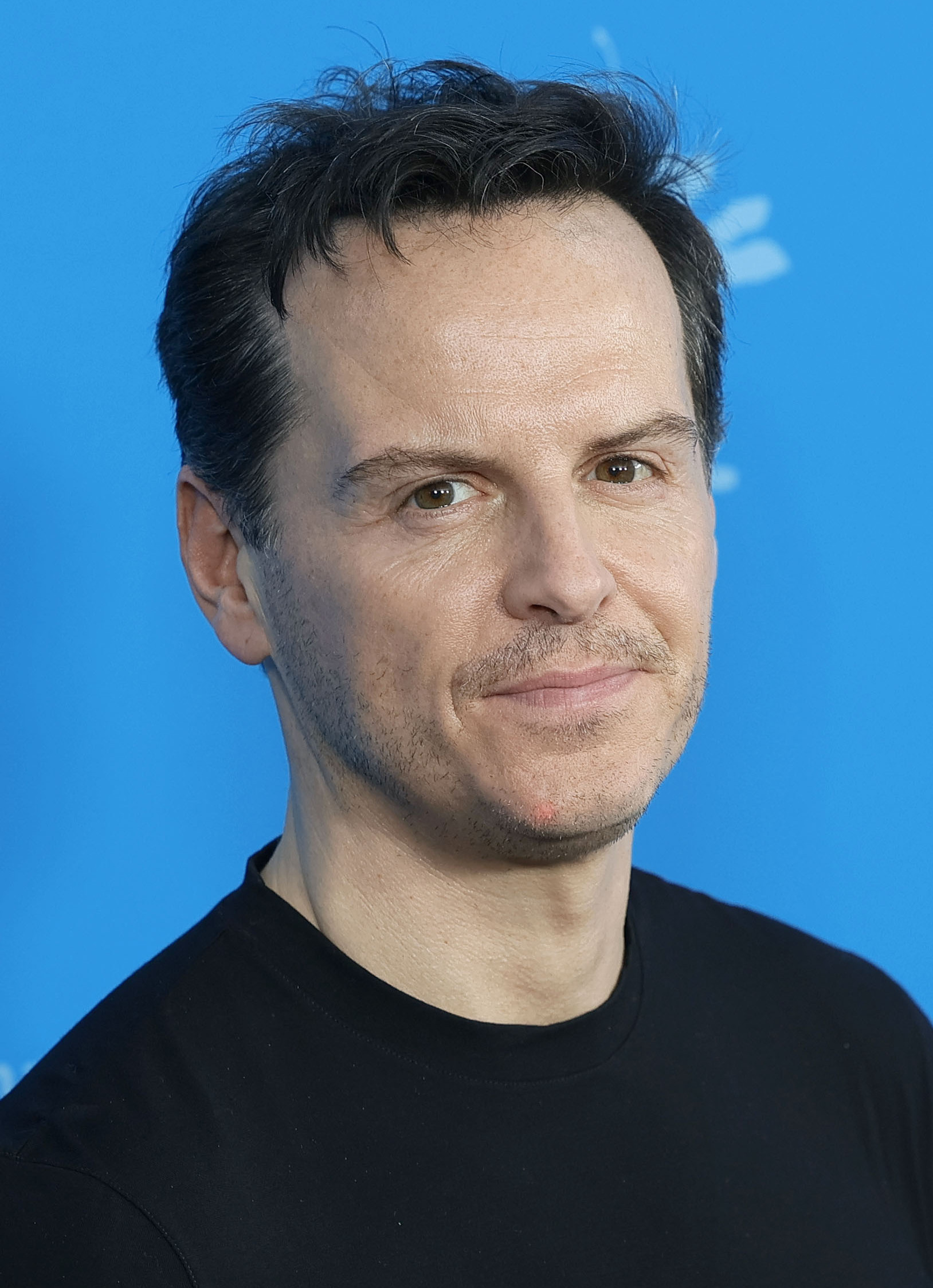
- Scott at Berlinale in 2025
Awards and nominations
Award	Wins	Nominations
Actor Awards	0	3
BAFTA TV Awards	1	1
Critic's Choice	1	2
Emmy Awards	0	3
European Film Awards Awards	0	1
Golden Globe Awards	0	3
Olivier Awards	2	4

Totals (Note: Certain award groups do not simply award one winner. They acknowledge several different recipients, have runners-up, and have third place. Since this is a specific recognition and is different from losing an award, runner-up mentions are considered wins in this award tally. For simplification and to avoid errors, each award in this list has been presumed to have had a prior nomination.)
- Wins: 27
- Nominations: 70

The article is the List of awards and nominations received by Andrew Scott.

Andrew Scott is an Irish actor known for his dynamic roles on stage and screen. He has received various accolades including a BAFTA TV Award, two Laurence Olivier Awards and two prizes from the Berlin International Film Festival, one Critics' Choice Television Award as well as three nominations for a Primetime Emmy Awards, three Golden Globe Awards, and three Screen Actors Guild Awards.

Scott started his career on television taking early roles in Longitude (2000), Band of Brothers (2001), and John Adams (2008). He gained prominence for his supporting role as Jim Moriarty in the BBC One / PBS series Sherlock (2010–2017) for which he earned a BAFTA TV Award for Best Actor in a Supporting Role. Scott garnered acclaim for his role as The Priest in the second season of the Amazon Prime Video romantic comedy-drama series Fleabag (2019). For his performance he received the Critics' Choice Television Award as well as nominations for a Golden Globe Award and two Screen Actors Guild Awards. For his role in Black Mirror: Smithereens (2019) he received a nomination for the Primetime Emmy Award for Outstanding Guest Actor in a Drama Series. He portrayed Tom Ripley in the Netflix thriller limited series Ripley (2024) earning nominations for the Primetime Emmy Award, Golden Globe Award, and Screen Actors Guild Award for Outstanding Actor in a Miniseries or TV Movie.

On film, he played the lead in the Andrew Haigh directed British romantic fantasy All of Us Strangers (2024), earning the National Society of Film Critics Award for Best Actor and the London Film Critics' Circle Award for Actor of the Year. He also earned nominations for the Golden Globe Award, the Gotham Independent Film Award, the British Independent Film Award, the Independent Spirit Award, and the Los Angeles Film Critics Association for Best Lead Performance. He portrayed American musical composer Richard Rodgers in the Richard Linklater biographical musical film Blue Moon (2025) earning the Berlin International Film Festival's Silver Bear for Best Supporting Performance.

On the West End stage, he won the Laurence Olivier Award for Outstanding Achievement in an Affiliate Theatre for A Girl in a Car with a Man (2005) and the Laurence Olivier Award for Best Actor for his performance as Garry Essendine in the revival of the Noël Coward play Present Laughter (2020). He was Olivier-nominated for portraying Prince Hamlet in the revival of the William Shakespeare play Hamlet (2018) and all the characters in the solo show adaptation of the Anton Chekov play Vanya (2024). For the later he reprised the role in the off Broadway transfer earning the Drama Desk Award, the Lucille Lortel Award and the New York Drama Critics' Circle for Outstanding Solo Performance.

== Major associations ==
=== Actor Awards ===
Year	Category	Nominated work	Result	Ref.
2020	Outstanding Actor in a Comedy Series	Fleabag (season two)	Nominated	
2020	Outstanding Ensemble in a Comedy Series	Fleabag (season two)	Nominated	
2025	Outstanding Actor in a Miniseries or Television Movie	Ripley	Nominated	

=== BAFTA Awards ===
Year	Category	Nominated work	Result	Ref.
British Academy Television Awards
2012	Best Supporting Actor	Sherlock	Won	

=== Critics' Choice Awards ===
Year	Category	Nominated work	Result	Ref.
Critics' Choice Television Awards
2019	Best Actor in a Supporting Role in a Comedy Series	Fleabag (season two)	Won	
2025	Best Actor in a Movie/Miniseries	Ripley	Nominated	

=== Emmy Awards ===
Year	Category	Nominated work	Result	Ref.
Primetime Emmy Awards
2020	Outstanding Guest Actor in a Drama Series	Black Mirror: Smithereens	Nominated	
2024	Outstanding Limited Series	Ripley	Nominated	
2024	Outstanding Lead Actor in a Limited Series or Movie	Ripley	Nominated	

=== European Film Awards ===
Year	Category	Nominated work	Result	Ref.
2027	European Actor	Elsinore	Pending	

=== Golden Globe Awards ===
Year	Category	Nominated work	Result	Ref.
2020	Best Supporting Actor – Television	Fleabag (season two)	Nominated	
2024	Best Actor in a Motion Picture – Drama	All of Us Strangers	Nominated	
2025	Best Actor – Miniseries or Television Film	Ripley	Nominated	

=== Laurence Olivier Awards ===
Year	Category	Nominated work	Result	Ref.
2005	Outstanding Achievement in an Affiliate Theatre	A Girl in a Car with a Man	Won	
2018	Best Actor	Hamlet	Nominated	
2020	Best Actor	Present Laughter	Won	
2024	Best Actor	Vanya	Nominated	

== Miscellaneous awards ==
Organizations	Year	Category	Work	Result	Ref.
AACTA International Awards	2024	Best Actor	All of Us Strangers	Nominated	
BBC Audio Drama Award	2012	Best Actor in a Supporting Role	Referee	Won	
BBC Audio Drama Award	2013	Best Actor in a Leading Role	Betrayal	Won	
Berlin International Film Festival	2004	Shooting Stars Award	—N/a	Won	
Berlin International Film Festival	2025	Silver Bear for Best Supporting Performance	Blue Moon	Won	
British Independent Film Awards	2014	Best Supporting Actor	Pride	Won	
British Independent Film Awards	2023	Best Lead Performance	All of Us Strangers	Nominated	
British Independent Film Awards	2026	Best Lead Performance	Elsinore	Pending	
British Independent Film Awards	2026	Best British Independent Film	Elsinore	Pending	
Capri Hollywood International Film Festival	2023	Best European Actor	All of Us Strangers	Won	
Dorian Awards	2024	Film Performance of the Year	All of Us Strangers	Nominated	
Dorian Awards	2024	Wilde Artist Award	—N/a	Nominated	
Irish Film and Television Award	2003	Best Actor in a Leading Role in a Film	Dead Bodies	Won	
Irish Film and Television Award	2013	Best Actor in a Supporting Role – Television	Sherlock	Won	
Irish Film and Television Award	2014	Best Actor in a Leading Role in a Film	The Stag	Nominated	
Irish Film and Television Award	2015	Best Actor in a Supporting Role in a Film	Pride	Nominated	
Irish Film and Television Award	2015	Best TV Actor in a Supporting Role	Sherlock	Nominated	
Irish Film and Television Award	2017	Best Actor in a Supporting Role in a Drama Series	The Hollow Crown	Nominated	
Irish Film and Television Award	2018	Best Actor in a Supporting Role in a Film	Handsome Devil	Nominated	
Irish Film and Television Award	2019	Best Actor in a Drama Series	Black Mirror	Won	
Irish Film and Television Award	2021	Best Supporting Actor (Drama)	His Dark Materials	Nominated	
Irish Film and Television Award	2024	Best Actor in a Leading Role in a Film	All of Us Strangers	Nominated	
Gold Derby Television Award	2019	Best Comedy Actor in a Supporting Role	Fleabag	Won	
Gotham Awards	2023	Outstanding Lead Performance	All of Us Strangers	Nominated	
Gotham Awards	2024	Outstanding Lead Performance in a Limited Series	Ripley	Won	
Gotham Awards	2025	Outstanding Supporting Performance	Blue Moon	Nominated	
Gotham Awards	2026	Outstanding Lead Performance	Elsinore	Pending	
London Film Critics' Circle	2024	Actor of the Year	All of Us Strangers	Won	
Los Angeles Film Critics Association	2025	Best Supporting Performance	Blue Moon	Runner-up	
National Society of Film Critics	2023	Best Actor	All of Us Strangers	Won	
Satellite Awards	2019	Best Supporting Actor – Series, Miniseries or Television Film	Fleabag	Nominated	
Satellite Awards	2022	Best Actor – Miniseries or Television Film	Oslo	Nominated	
Satellite Awards	2024	Best Actor – Motion Picture	All of Us Strangers	Nominated	
St. Louis Film Critics Association	2025	Best Supporting Actor	Blue Moon	Nominated	
Television Critics Association Awards	2024	Individual Achievement in Drama	Ripley	Nominated	

== Theatre accolades ==
Organizations	Year	Category	Work	Result	Ref.
Critics' Circle Theatre Award	2017	Best Shakespearean Performance	Hamlet	Won	
Critics' Circle Theatre Award	2020	Best Actor	Present Laughter	Won	
Critics' Circle Theatre Award	2024	Best Actor	Vanya	Won	
Dorian Theater Awards	2025	Outstanding Lead Performance in an Off-Broadway Production	Vanya	Won	
Dorian Theater Awards	2025	LGBTQ+ Theater Trailblazer		Nominated	
Drama Desk Awards	2025	Outstanding Solo Performance	Vanya	Won	
Drama League Awards	2007	Distinguished Performance	The Vertical Hour	Nominated	
Drama League Awards	2025	Distinguished Performance	Vanya	Nominated	
Evening Standard Theatre Award	2017	Best Actor	Hamlet	Nominated	
Evening Standard Theatre Award	2019	Best Actor	Present Laughter	Won	
Evening Standard Theatre Award	2023	Best Actor	Vanya	Won	
Irish Times Theatre Award	1998	Best Actor in a Supporting Role	Long Day's Journey into Night	Nominated	
Lucille Lortel Awards	2025	Outstanding Solo Show	Vanya	Won	
New York Drama Critics' Circle	2025	Best Individual Performance	Vanya	Won	
Off-Broadway Alliance Awards	2025	Best Solo Performance	Vanya	Nominated	
Outer Critics Circle Awards	2025	Outstanding Solo Performance	Vanya	Nominated	
WhatsOnStage Award	2020	Best Actor in a Play	Present Laughter	Won	
WhatsOnStage Award	2024	Best Performer in a Play	Vanya	Nominated	
