= Pat Collins (director) =

Irish film director and screenwriter

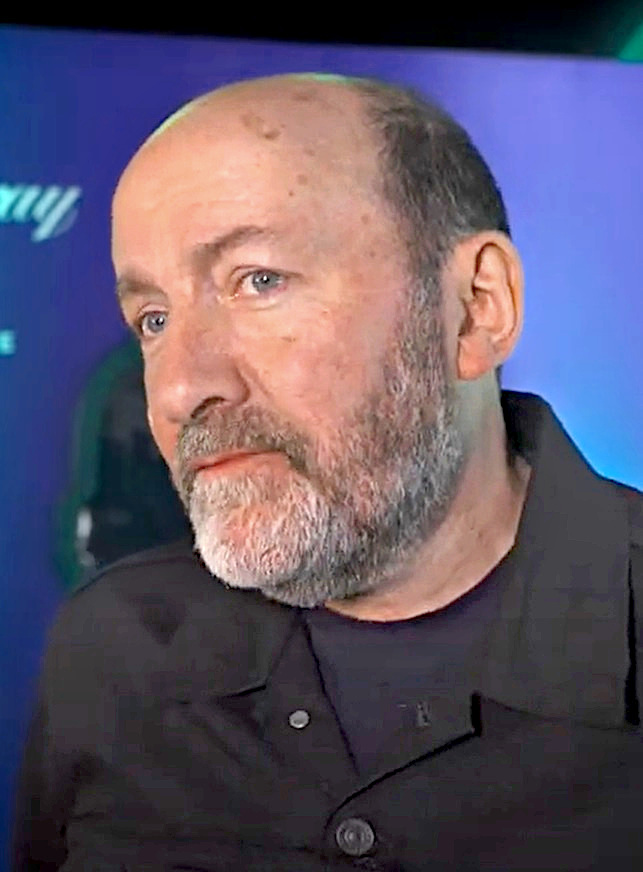
- Collins at DIFF 2024
- Born: Drimoleague, County Cork, Ireland
- Occupation: Film director
- Years active: 1999–present

Pat Collins is an Irish film director. He is best known for his three dramatic feature films: Silence (2012); Song of Granite (2017); and That They May Face the Rising Sun (2023). He is also a prolific director of documentary films.

In 2017, Song of Granite was selected as Ireland's submission for the Academy Award for Best International Feature Film. In 2024, That They May Face the Rising Sun won Best Irish Film at the Dublin International Film Festival.

== Filmography ==
=== Feature films ===
- Silence (2012)
- Song of Granite (2017)
- That They May Face the Rising Sun (2023)

=== Documentaries ===
- Michael Hartnett: A Necklace of Wrens (1999)
- Talking to the Dead (2000)
- Idir na Línte [Between the Lines] (2001)
- Oileán Thoraí [Tory Island] (2002)
- Abbas Kiarostami: The Art of Living (2003) (co-directed with Fergus Daly)
- Frank O'Connor: The Lonely Voice (2003)
- Marooned (2004)
- Beyond the Mountain (2005)
- Cathair Corcaigh [Cork City] (2005)
- Domhnach in Éireann [Sunday in Ireland] (2005)
- John McGahern: A Private World (2005)
- David Marcus: A Conversation with Dermot Bolger (2006)
- Rebel County (2006)
- Ar Thóir Logainmeacha [In Search of Placenames] (2007)
- Na Duganna [Docks] (2007)
- Nuala Ní Dhomhnaill: Taibhsí i mBéal na Gaoithe [Nuala Ní Dhomhnaill: Ghosts in the Mouth of the Wind] (2007)
- Loch Dearg (2008)
- Pilgrim (2008)
- Famine in Ireland: Remember Skibbereen (2009)
- Loch Hyne (2009)
- What We Leave in Our Wake (2010)
- Tim Robinson: Connemara (2011)
- Into the Light: Nettle Coat (2012)
- Fathom (2013)
- What Remains (2013)
- Ballade (2014)
- Tommy: To Tell You the Truth (2014)
- Living in a Coded Land (2014)
- William McKeown: Idir Neamh Agus Talamh [William McKeown: Between Heaven and Earth] (2016)
- Twilight (2017)
- Henry Glassie: Field Work (2019)
- All That Is, Is Light (2021)
- Songs of the Open Road (2022)
