= Silence (2012 film) =

2012 film

- Directed by: Pat Collins
- Written by: Pat Collins; Eoghan Mac Giolla Bhríde; Sharon Whooley
- Produced by: Tina O'Reilly
- Cinematography: Richard Kendrick
- Edited by: Tadhg O'Sullivan
- Production companies: Harvest Films; South Wind Blows
- Release dates: 23 February 2012 (Dublin International Film Festival); 27 July 2012 (Ireland)
- Running time: 87 minutes
- Countries: Ireland; Germany
- Languages: Irish; English

Silence is a 2012 Irish-German drama film directed by Pat Collins.

== Plot ==
An Irish expatriate sound recordist living in Germany accepts a job that tasks him with producing field recordings of natural silence. The job takes him back to his place of birth in the West of Ireland and precipitates an emotional journey into his past.

== Cast ==
- Eoghan Mac Giolla Bhríde as Eoghan Mac Suibhne
- Hilary O'Shaughnessy as Girlfriend
- Andrew Bennett as Barman
- Jens K. Müller as Jens K. Müller
- Patrick O'Connor as Local Man (The Burren)
- Michael Harding as Local Man (Ballycroy)
- Tommy Fahy as Tommy Fahy
- Tim Robinson as Tim Robinson
- Pater Lacey as Pater Lacey
- Marie Coyne as Marie Coyne
- Jordan Shields as Jordan Shields
- Paul Rogers as Paul Rogers
