= Anna Bederke =

German actress

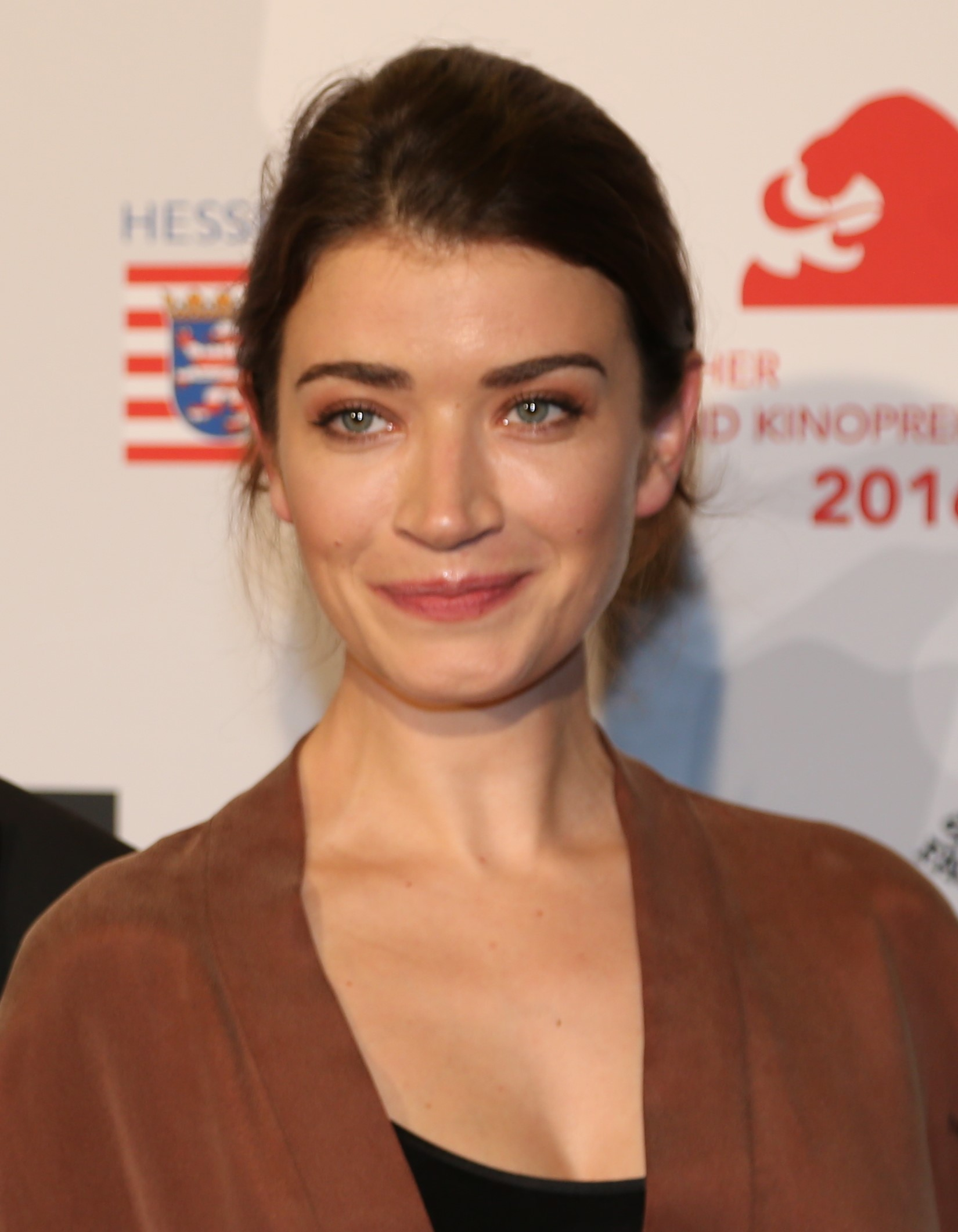
- Anna Bederke in 2016.
- Born: 1981 (age 44–45); Hamburg, West Germany
- Occupation: Actress
- Years active: 2009-present

Anna Bederke (born 1981) is a German actress. She has appeared in more than ten films since 2009.

== Selected filmography ==
Year	Title	Role	Notes
2009	Soul Kitchen		
2013	Frau Ella	Lina	
2014	Till Eulenspiegel	Kathrin Lüdinghusen	TV film
2017	Mr. Stein Goes Online		
2023	That They May Face the Rising Sun	Kate	Lead role
2024	Dying	Liv	
2026	Ghost Song		
