= Andrew Scott (actor) =

Irish actor (born 1976)

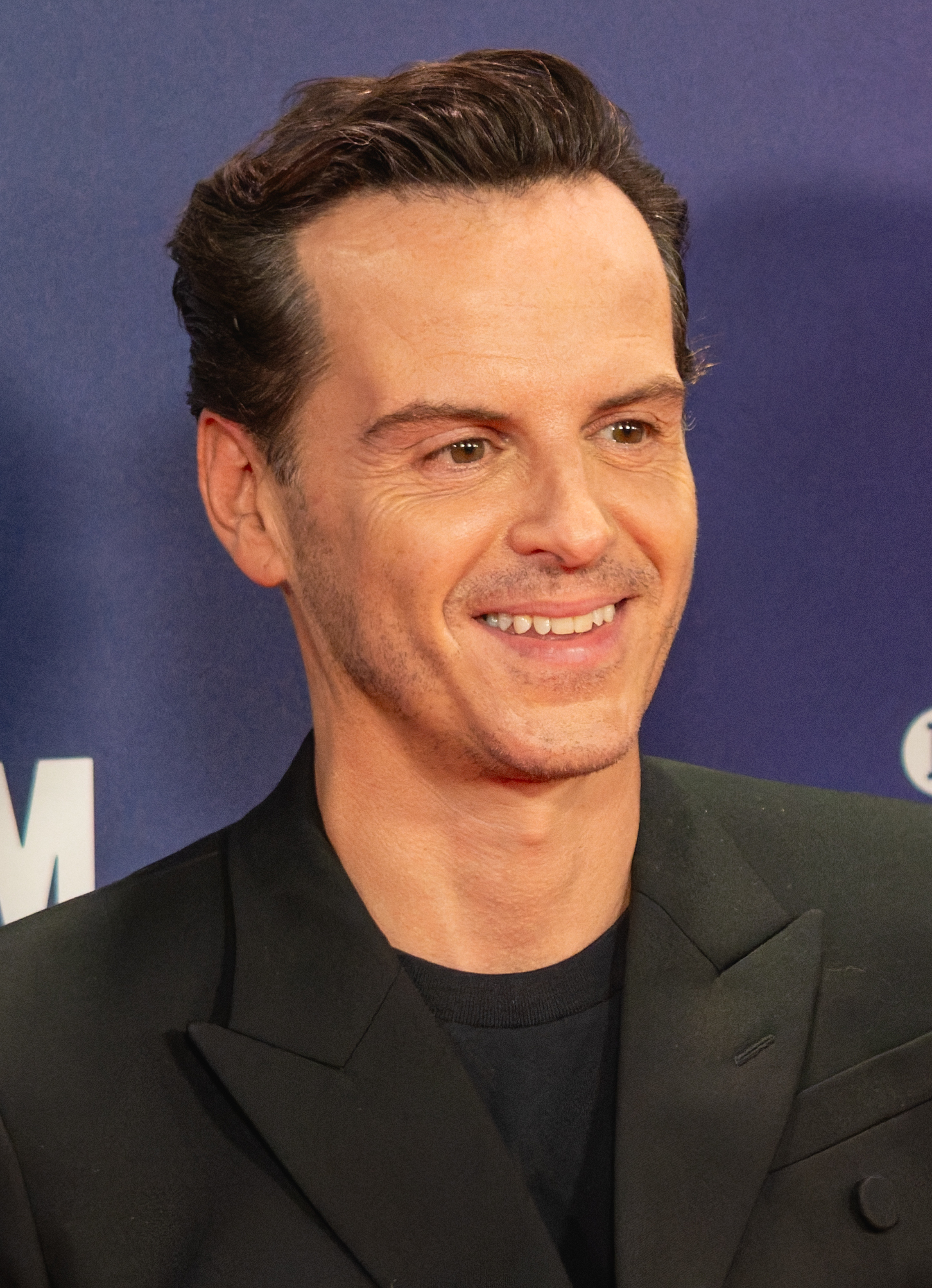
- Scott in 2025
- Born: 21 October 1976 (age 50); Dublin, Ireland
- Education: Gonzaga College; Trinity College Dublin (withdrew)
- Occupation: Actor
- Years active: 1994–present
- Awards: Full list

Andrew Scott (born 21 October 1976) is an Irish actor. Known for his roles on stage and screen, Scott has been awarded two Laurence Olivier Awards, a BAFTA TV Award, and a Silver Bear, in addition to nominations for three Primetime Emmy Awards and three Golden Globe Awards.

Scott first came to prominence for his portrayal as James Moriarty in the BBC series Sherlock (2010–2017), for which he won the BAFTA Television Award. His role as the priest in the second series of Fleabag (2019) earned him the Critics' Choice Television Award. He received Emmy nominations for his roles as a grief-stricken rideshare driver in Black Mirror: Smithereens (2019) and as Tom Ripley in the Netflix thriller series, Ripley (2024).

On film, he made his acting debut in the drama, Korea (1995). He was Golden Globe Award-nominated for his starring role as a lonely screenwriter in the romantic drama film, All of Us Strangers (2023). He is also known for his roles in films, such as Pride (2014), Spectre (2015), Denial (2016), 1917 (2019), Catherine Called Birdy (2022), Blue Moon (2025), Wake Up Dead Man (2025), and Pressure (2026).

On stage, Scott earned Laurence Olivier Awards for Outstanding Achievement in an Affiliate Theatre for his role as a witty camera man in A Girl in a Car with a Man (2005) and Best Actor for playing Garry Essendine in the West End revival of Present Laughter (2019). He was Olivier-nominated for his roles in Hamlet (2018) and Vanya (2024). He made his Broadway debut in the David Hare play The Vertical Hour (2006).

== Early life and education ==
Andrew Scott was born on 21 October 1976 in Dublin to Nora and Jim Scott. His mother was an art teacher, while his father worked at an employment agency. He is the second of three children; he has an older sister, Sarah, and a younger sister, Hannah. Scott was raised as a Catholic, but he no longer practices.

He attended Gonzaga College while taking weekend classes at Ann Kavanagh's Young People's Theatre in Rathfarnham, and he appeared in two advertisements on Irish television. At 17, Scott was chosen for a starring role in his first film, Korea. He won a bursary to art school but elected to study drama at Trinity College Dublin, which he left after six months to join Dublin's Abbey Theatre and then moved to London when he was 22. He once stated to the London Evening Standard that he always had a "healthy obsession" with acting.

== Career ==
=== 1992–2009: Rise to prominence ===
In 1992, he portrayed Stan in the Neil Simon play, Brighton Beach Memoirs, at Andrews Lane Theatre in Dublin. Scott made his film acting debut in the Irish drama, Korea (1995), which premiered at the Toronto International Film Festival. Scott worked with film and theatre director Karel Reisz in the Gate Theatre, Dublin, production of Long Day's Journey into Night (1998), playing the role of Edmund Tyrone, the younger son, in Eugene O'Neill's play about a wealthy but tortured Irish family living in Connecticut in 1912. He won Actor of the Year at the Sunday Independent Spirit of Life Arts Awards in 1998 and received an Irish Times Theatre Award nomination for Best Supporting Actor.

Scott had a small role as Michael Bodkin in the film Nora, and another small role in a television adaptation of Henry James's The American, before making his London theatre debut in Conor McPherson's Dublin Carol at the Royal Court Theatre. He appeared briefly in the BAFTA-winning drama Longitude (2000) opposite Sir Michael Gambon, whom he called "a brilliant actor" and "the best actor in England". He also acted in Steven Spielberg's World War II miniseries Band of Brothers (2001).

In 2004, he was named one of European Film Promotions' "Shooting Stars." After starring in My Life in Film for the BBC, he received his first Laurence Olivier Award for his role in A Girl in a Car with a Man at The Royal Court, and he was nominated for a Theatregoers' Choice Award for his performance in the Royal National Theatre's Aristocrats. He also originated the roles of the twin brothers in the Royal Court's world premiere production of Christopher Shinn's Dying City, which was later nominated for a Pulitzer Prize. In 2006, he made his Broadway debut in the Music Box Theater production of The Vertical Hour written by David Hare and directed by Sam Mendes. Scott starred alongside Bill Nighy and Julianne Moore. He was nominated for a Drama League Award for this performance.

Scott appeared as William Stephens Smith in the historical miniseries, John Adams. In 2009, he appeared in Sea Wall, a one-man show written especially for him by playwright Simon Stephens. Later that year, he starred in a sold-out run of Cock at the Royal Court, which won an Olivier Award in 2010. His role in an episode of Foyle's War, in which he plays a prisoner determined to allow himself to hang for a crime he may not have committed, was described in Slant as a "standout performance". His film appearances include a role in Chasing Cotards (a short film made for IMAX); a role in the short film, Silent Things; and the role of Paul McCartney in the BBC film Lennon Naked. He also stars in the critically acclaimed 2010 film The Duel.

=== 2010–2017: Sherlock and breakthrough ===
He gained prominence for his role as Sherlock Holmes's nemesis Jim Moriarty opposite Benedict Cumberbatch in the drama series Sherlock, which he played from 2010 to 2017. For his performance, he received the British Academy Television Award for Best Supporting Actor. In an interview with The Independent, Scott stated "Sherlock has changed all our careers, and I'm really pleased about that. It gives you the benefit of the doubt because executives like to see recognisable faces ... It was overwhelming to be on a TV show that is quite so popular. That took me totally by surprise. People had an instant affection for it from the first episode. The reaction was extraordinary."

He had a guest role in the second series of Garrow's Law playing a gay man on trial for sodomy. In 2010, he appeared in the Old Vic production of Noël Coward's Design for Living directed by Anthony Page. In 2011, he played the lead role of Julian in Ben Power's adaptation of Henrik Ibsen's epic Emperor and Galilean at the Royal National Theatre in London. He had a part in the drama The Hour as Adam Le Ray, a failed actor. The series starred Dominic West and Romola Garai. In addition to his stage and TV work, Scott is known for his voice acting in radio plays and audiobooks, such as the roles of Jay Gatsby in F. Scott Fitzgerald's The Great Gatsby and Stephen Dedalus in James Joyce's Ulysses.

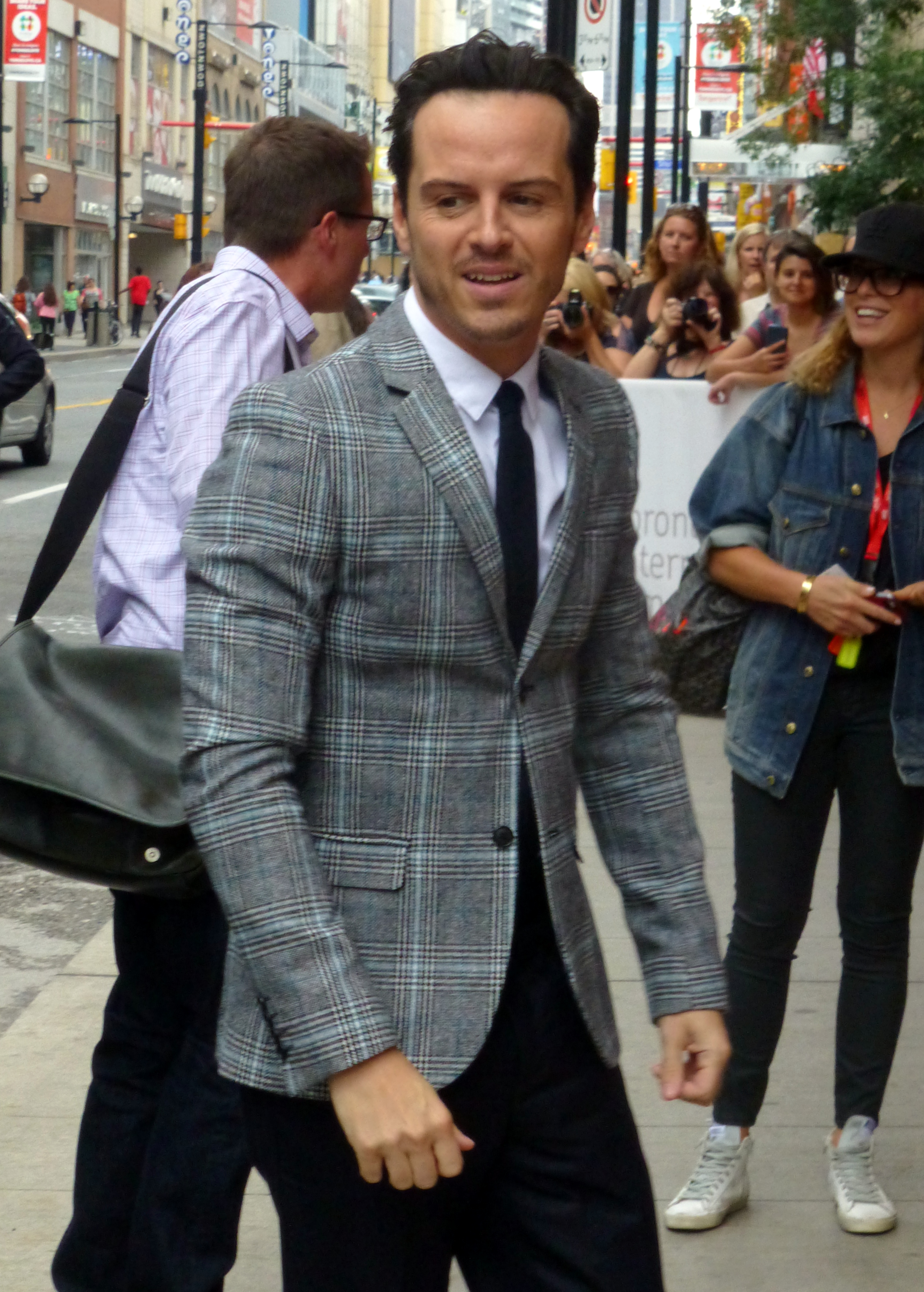
Scott at the 2014 Toronto Film Festival

In November 2013, Scott took part in the Royal National Theatre's 50 Years on Stage, a theatrical event which consisted of excerpts from many plays over the National's fifty-year run and was broadcast live on television. Alongside Dominic Cooper, Scott performed a scene from Tony Kushner's epic play Angels in America about the AIDS crisis in New York City. In 2014 Scott took to the stage in Birdland, written by Simon Stephens and directed by Carrie Cracknell at the Royal Court Theatre, playing the central character of Paul, a rock star on the verge of a breakdown. Scott received positive reviews for the performance, with comments such as "beautifully played" and [he] "pulls off the brilliant trick of being totally dead behind the eyes and fascinating at the same time, an appalling creature who's both totem and symptom".

In 2015, he appeared in the James Bond film Spectre as Max Denbigh, a member of the British government intent on shutting down the Double-0 section. Of the experience, Scott stated, "I was thrilled to be asked. I found it difficult to be in that film. I think I could've just been a bit better. I think I allowed myself to be a little intimidated by the budget and the history of the franchise, and I don't think I attempted enough to be original". The following year he appeared in the romantic drama film This Beautiful Fantastic (2016), directed and written by Simon Aboud.

Also, in 2016, he portrayed solicitor Anthony Julius in the film Denial alongside Rachel Weisz, Timothy Spall and Tom Wilkinson.

In 2017, Scott's performance in the title role of Hamlet won critical acclaim and earned him the nomination for Laurence Olivier Award for Best Actor in a Leading Role in a Play. The play was directed by Robert Icke and first produced at the Almeida Theatre. Michael Billington of The Guardian praised Scott's performance, writing, "Scott's Hamlet is most memorable for his charm, self-mockery and ability to speak directly to the audience." The production was filmed and broadcast on BBC Two at Easter 2018. Scott also voiced Obake in Big Hero 6: The Series (2017).

=== 2018–present: Career expansion ===
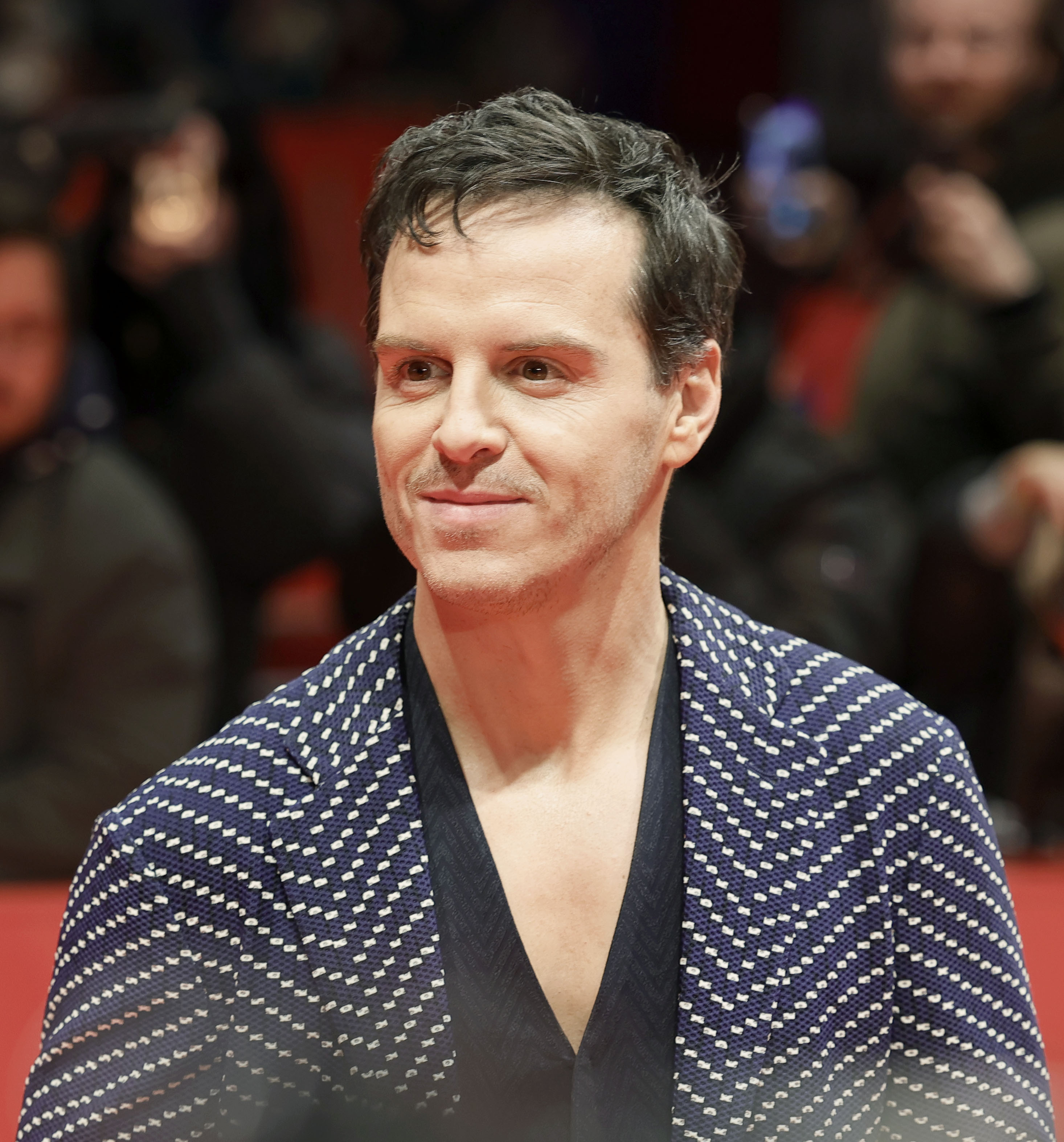
Scott at the 2025 Berlin International Film Festival

Scott portrayed Edgar in the television adaptation of William Shakespeare's King Lear (2018). Scott starred alongside Anthony Hopkins, Emma Thompson, and Florence Pugh. The following year, he portrayed The Priest in series two of the comedy-drama Fleabag (2019), created by Phoebe Waller-Bridge. For his performance, he received acclaim and nominations for a Golden Globe Award and Screen Actors Guild Award, and won a Critics' Choice Television Award. In 2019, he appeared in the anthology series Black Mirror, as the lead character Chris in the Season 5 episode "Smithereens" for which he was nominated for the Primetime Emmy Award for Outstanding Guest Actor in a Drama Series. Also in 2019, he acted in the Sam Mendes drama 1917, which received acclaim as well as an Academy Award for Best Picture nomination.

In June to August 2019, Scott starred as the matinee idol Garry Essendine in Matthew Warchus's revival of Noël Coward's Present Laughter at the Old Vic in London. He received acclaim for the role as well as the Laurence Olivier Award for Best Actor. He portrayed Colonel John Parry/Jopari/Stanislaus Grumman in an adaptation of Philip Pullman's His Dark Materials from 2019 to 2022. He played Lord Merlin in the miniseries The Pursuit of Love (2021). Also that year, he portrayed Terje Rød-Larsen in the film Oslo (2021). The following year, he acted in the comedy Catherine Called Birdy (2022).

In 2023, Scott starred opposite Paul Mescal in the romantic drama All of Us Strangers. His performance earned him a nomination for the Golden Globe Award for Best Actor – Motion Picture Drama at the 81st Golden Globe Awards. He also starred in Vanya, a one-man production of Anton Chekhov's Uncle Vanya, which earned him acclaim.

Scott next starred as Tom Ripley in Ripley, a television series adapted from Patricia Highsmith's Ripley novels. For the role, he received nominations for the Primetime Emmy Award for Outstanding Lead Actor in a Limited or Anthology Series or Movie and the Golden Globe Award for Best Actor – Miniseries or Television Film.

In June 2025, Scott was invited to join the Academy of Motion Picture Arts and Sciences. Later that year, he starred as part of an ensemble cast in the murder mystery, Wake Up Dead Man, the third film in the Knives Out series.

== Personal life ==
Scott publicly came out as gay in an interview with The Independent in November 2013. Scott was ranked at No. 22 on The Independent's Rainbow List 2014, and No. 4 on the newspaper's Pride List for 2024. In 2023, he said that when he first started out as an actor, people had encouraged him not to disclose his sexual orientation.

Scott worked with the charity IdeasTap, mentoring young actors and helping them to start their careers, until the charity closed in June 2015.

== Acting credits ==
=== Film ===
Year	Title	Role	Notes	Ref.
1995	Korea	Eamonn Doyle		
1997	Drinking Crude	Paul		
1998	Saving Private Ryan	Soldier on the Beach		
1998	The Tale of Sweety Barrett	Danny		
2000	Nora	Michael Bodkin		
2001	I Was the Cigarette Girl	Tim	Short film	
2003	Dead Bodies	Tommy McGann		
2009	The Duel	Ivan Andreich Laevsky		
2010	Chasing Cotards	Hart Elliot-Hinwood	Short film	
2010	Silent Things	Jake	Short film	
2012	Sea Wall	Alex	Short film	
2013	The Stag	Davin		
2014	Locke	Donal (voice)		
2014	Pride	Gethin Roberts		
2014	Jimmy's Hall	Father Seamus		
2015	Spectre	C (Max Denbigh)		
2015	Victor Frankenstein	Inspector Roderick Turpin		
2016	Alice Through the Looking Glass	Addison Bennett		
2016	Swallows and Amazons	Lazlow		
2016	Denial	Anthony Julius		
2016	This Beautiful Fantastic	Vernon Kelly		
2016	Handsome Devil	Dan Sherry		
2017	The Hope Rooms	Sean	Short film	
2017	The Delinquent Season	Chris		
2018	A Dark Place	Donald Devlin	aka Steel Country	
2019	Cognition	Elias	Short film	
2019	1917	Lieutenant Leslie		
2022	Catherine Called Birdy	Lord Rollo		
2023	All of Us Strangers	Adam		
2025	Back in Action	Baron		
2025	Blue Moon	Richard Rodgers		
2025	Wake Up Dead Man	Lee Ross		
2026	Pressure	James Stagg		
2026	Elsinore	Ian Charleson	Also producer	
2027	A Place in Hell †	TBA	Post-production	
TBA	Walk the Blue Fields †	TBA	Filming	
TBA	Fonda †	TBA	Filming	

=== Television ===
Year	Title	Role	Notes	Ref.
1995	Budgie	Peter	TV film	
1998	Miracle at Midnight	Michael Grunbaum	TV film	
1998	The American	Valentin de Bellegarde	TV film	
2000	Longitude	John Campbell	4 episodes	
2001	Band of Brothers	Pvt. John "Cowboy" Hall	Episode: "Day of Days"	
2003	Killing Hitler	Sniper	Documentary film	
2004	My Life in Film	Jones	6 episodes	
2005	The Quatermass Experiment	Vernon	TV film	
2007	Nuclear Secrets	Andrei Sakarov	Episode: "Superbomb"	
2008	John Adams	Col. William Smith	4 episodes	
2008	Little White Lie	Barry	TV film	
2010	Foyle's War	James Devereaux	Episode: "The Hide"	
2010	Lennon Naked	Paul McCartney	TV film	
2010	Garrow's Law	Captain Jones	Episode: "Episode #2.2"	
2010–17	Sherlock	James "Jim" Moriarty	8 episodes	
2011	The Hour	Adam Le Ray	2 episodes	
2012	Blackout	Dalien Bevan	3 episodes	
2012	The Scapegoat	Paul Spencer	TV film	
2012	The Town	Mark Nicholas	3 episodes	
2013	Dates	Christian	Episode: "Jenny and Christian"	
2013	Legacy	Viktor Koslov	TV film	
2016	The Hollow Crown: The Wars of the Roses	King Louis	Episode: "Henry VI, Part 2"	
2016	Earth's Seasonal Secrets	Narrator	4 episodes	
2017	Quacks	Charles Dickens	Episode: "The Lady's Abscess"	
2017–21	School of Roars	Narrator / various voices	Main cast	
2017–18	Big Hero 6: The Series	Obake (voice)	11 episodes	
2018	Hamlet	Prince Hamlet	TV film; taped stage production	
2018	King Lear	Edgar	TV film	
2019	Fleabag	The Priest	6 episodes	
2019	Black Mirror	Christopher Michael Gillhaney	Episode: "Smithereens"	
2019	Modern Love	Tobin	Episode: "Hers Was a World of One"	
2019–22	His Dark Materials	Colonel John Parry / Jopari	7 episodes	
2021	The Pursuit of Love	Lord Merlin	3 episodes	
2021	Oslo	Terje Rød-Larsen	TV film	
2024	Ripley	Tom Ripley	8 episodes; also producer	
2025	Too Much	Jim Wenlich Rice	2 episodes	
2026	The Comeback	Brandon Wallick	3 episodes	
2026	It Gets Worse	Brian	1 episode	

=== Theatre ===
Year	Title	Character	Director	Company/Venue	Ref.
1992	Brighton Beach Memoirs	Stan	Rita Tighe	Andrews Lane Theatre, Dublin	
1996	Six Characters in Search of an Author	The Son	John Crowley	Abbey Theatre	
1996	The Marriage of Figaro	Cherubino	Brian Brady	Abbey Theatre	
1996	A Woman of No Importance	Gerald Arbuthnot	Ben Barnes	Abbey Theatre	
1997	The Lonesome West	Father Welsh	Garry Hynes	Druid Theatre Co.	
1998	Long Day's Journey into Night	Edmund	Karel Reisz	The Gate, Dublin	
2000	Dublin Carol	Mark	Ian Rickson	The Old Vic	
2000	Dublin Carol	Mark	Ian Rickson	Royal Court Theatre	
2000	The Secret Fall of Constance Wilde	Lord Alfred Douglas	Patrick Mason	Abbey Theatre	
2000	The Secret Fall of Constance Wilde	Lord Alfred Douglas	Patrick Mason	Barbican, RSC	
2001	The Coming World	Ed/Ty	Mark Brickman	Soho Theatre	
2001	Crave	B	Vicky Featherstone	Royal Court Theatre	
2002	Original Sin	Angel	Peter Gill	Sheffield Crucible	
2002	The Cavalcaders	Rory	Robin Lefevre	Tricycle Theatre	
2003	Playing the Victim	Valya	Richard Wilson	Told by an Idiot	
2004	A Girl in a Car with a Man	Alex	Joe Hill-Gibbins	Royal Court Theatre	
2005	Aristocrats	Casimir	Tom Cairns	National Theatre Company	
2006	Dying City	Craig/Peter	James McDonald	Royal Court Theatre	
2006–07	The Vertical Hour	Philip Lucas	Sam Mendes	The Music Box, NY	
2008	Sea Wall	Alex	George Perrin	The Bush Theatre	
2009	Roaring Trade	Donny	Roxana Silbert	Soho Theatre	
2009	Cock	M	James McDonald	Royal Court Theatre	
2010	Design for Living	Leo	Anthony Page	The Old Vic	
2011	Emperor and Galilean	Julian	Jonathan Kent	Royal National Theatre	
2014	Birdland	Paul	Carrie Cracknell	Royal Court Theatre	
2015	The Dazzle	Langley Collyer	Simon Evans	Found111	
2016	Letters Live	Reader		Freemasons' Hall	
2017	Hamlet	Hamlet	Robert Icke	Almeida Theatre & Harold Pinter Theatre	
2018	Sea Wall	Alex	George Perrin	The Old Vic	
2019	Present Laughter	Garry Essendine	Matthew Warchus	The Old Vic	
2020	Three Kings	Patrick	Matthew Warchus	The Old Vic (Old Vic: In Camera)	
2023	Vanya	All characters	Sam Yates	Richmond Theatre & Duke of York's Theatre	
2025	Vanya	All characters	Sam Yates	Lucille Lortel Theatre	

=== Music video ===
Year	Title	Artist	Role	Ref.
2025	"People Watching"	Sam Fender	Jack	

=== Audio ===
Year	Title	Role	Notes	Ref.
2002	Neuromancer	Finn	Supporting Role	
2012	Betrayal	Jerry	Main role	
2024	The Queen's Guard	Robb the Protector	Main role	
2026	Starlings	Declan	Main role	

== Awards and nominations ==
In 2012 Scott won the BAFTA Television Award for Best Supporting Actor for his role in Sherlock. He received the Critics' Choice Television Award for Best Supporting Actor in a Comedy Series for his role as the priest on the second series of Fleabag in 2019, and was nominated for a Golden Globe in 2020. He won the Peabody Award for his role in Ripley, as well as nominations for Golden Globe and Primetime Emmy Awards for the series. He has also received numerous other accolades, including a BAFTA TV Award, two Laurence Olivier Awards, and a British Independent Film Award. On stage, Scott won the Laurence Olivier Award for Best Actor for his role in Present Laughter at The Old Vic. He also won the Laurence Olivier Award for Outstanding Achievement in an Affiliate Theatre in 2005 for his role in A Girl in a Car with a Man at the Royal Court Theatre.

== See also ==
- List of Irish actors
