= John McGahern =

Irish writer

- Born: 12 November 1934; Dublin; raised at Corramahon, Ballinamore, County Leitrim, Ireland
- Died: 30 March 2006 (aged 71); Mater Hospital, Dublin, Ireland
- Resting place: St Patrick's Church, Aughawillan
- Citizenship: Irish
- Occupation: Writer
- Spouse(s): Annikki Laaksi (married 1965, divorced 1969); Madeline Green (married 1973)
- Children: Joseph John Kelly, born on 07 January 1964 at Dulwich Hospital, London
- Writing career
- Pen name: Sean
- Language: English
- Period: 20th – 21st century
- Genres: Novel, short story
- Notable works: The Barracks; The Dark; The Leavetaking; The Pornographer; Amongst Women; That They May Face the Rising Sun

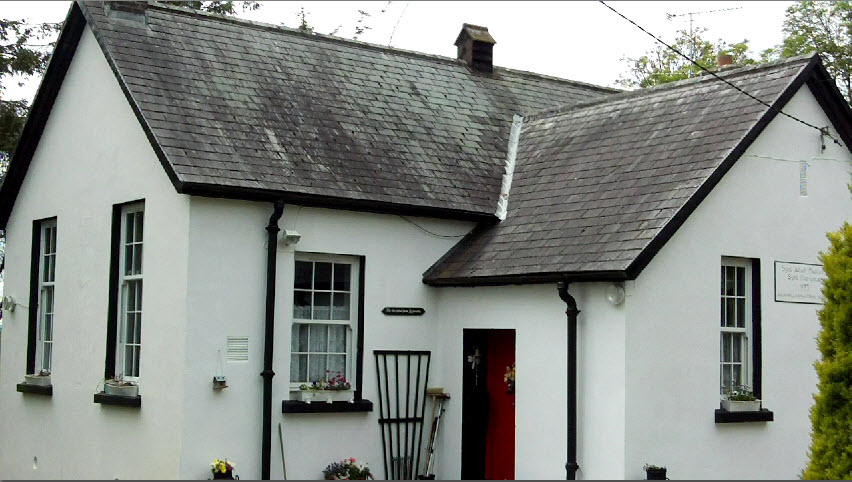
Aughawillan National School, where John's mother taught until her illness and death in 1944

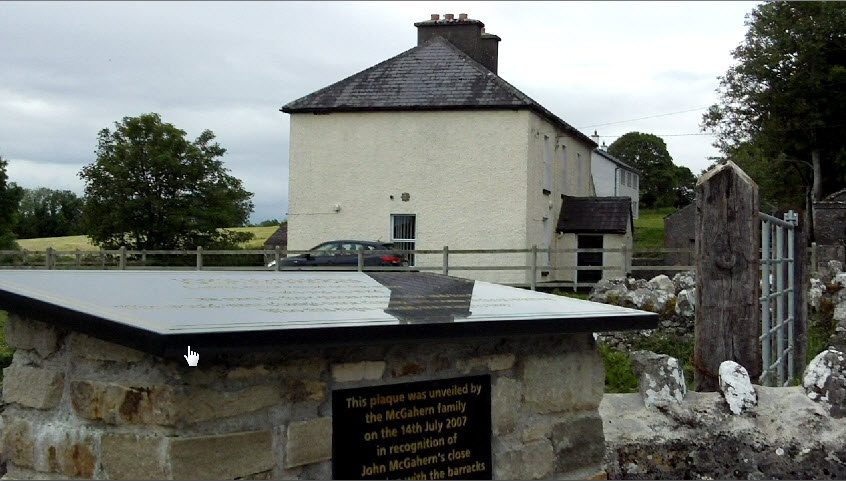
The Barracks, in Cootehall, where McGahern lived from the age of 10

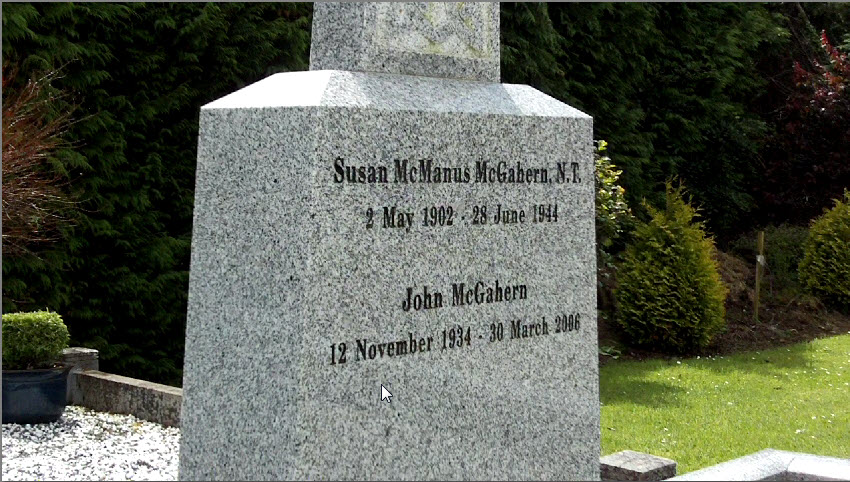
The grave of McGahern and his mother Susan

John McGahern, by Patrick Swift, 1960

John McGahern (12 November 1934 – 30 March 2006) was an Irish writer and novelist.

Known for the detailed dissection of Irish life found in works such as The Barracks, The Dark and Amongst Women, he was hailed by The Observer as "the greatest living Irish novelist" and in its obituary The Guardian described him as "arguably the most important Irish novelist since Samuel Beckett".

== Biography ==
Born in Dublin, John McGahern was initially raised at Corramahon, a townland located just over a mile east-north-east from the small town of Ballinamore in the south-east of County Leitrim. The eldest of seven (two sons and five daughters), he was raised alongside his siblings on the small farm at Corramahon. McGahern's mother, Susan (née McManus), ran the farm (with some local help), while also maintaining a job as a primary school teacher at the local national school, Aughawillan National School. The school was located in the townland of Aughawillan, right beside Corramahon, just over a mile east-north-east from Ballinamore; Aughawillan townland is very close to County Leitrim's boundary with the north-western part of neighbouring County Cavan. Susan and her family were local, the McManus family home being in the townland of Drumderg, right beside the townland of Corraleehan, a few miles north of Ballinamore. Drumderg townland is right beside County Cavan, with the county boundary between County Leitrim and County Cavan, and, therefore, the provincial boundary between Connacht and Ulster, running along the edge of the townland, Drumderg being on the Leitrim side of the county boundary. His father, Sergeant Francis (Frank) McGahern, was a native of Scrabby (later renamed Loch Gowna in 1950), a village on the shores of Lough Gowna in the west of County Cavan.

Sergeant Frank McGahern first met the then Susan McManus in 1924 in Ballinamore, when he was posted there, just after the Irish Civil War, as a garda with the Garda Síochána; she was working in the town as a primary school teacher at the time. Susan had trained as a teacher at Trinity College, Dublin (TCD), having won a scholarship to study there. Following her graduation, she had returned to her native South Leitrim. Frank and Susan finally married at St. Bridget's Church at Corraleehan (also known as Corraleehan Chapel), near Ballinamore, in August 1932. Sergeant McGahern later served with the Garda Síochána in Cootehall, a village in the far north of County Roscommon, an area adjacent to South Leitrim, where he lived in Cootehall Garda Barracks, around twenty miles distant from his family. McGahern's mother died of cancer in 1944, when John was 10, resulting in the uprooting of the McGahern children to their new home with their father in Cootehall Garda Barracks. Sgt. McGahern was quite a violent man, being physically abusive to his children.

In the years following his mother's death, McGahern completed his primary schooling in the local primary school, and ultimately won a scholarship to the Presentation Brothers secondary school in Carrick-on-Shannon. Having travelled daily to complete his second-level education, McGahern continued to accumulate academic accolades by winning the county scholarship in his Leaving Certificate enabling him to continue his education to the third level.

McGahern was offered a place at St Patrick's College of Education in Drumcondra where he trained to be a teacher. Upon graduation, he began his career as a primary school teacher at Scoil Eoin Báiste (Belgrove), a national school in Clontarf, where, for a period, he taught the academic Declan Kiberd. He returned to third-level education in University College, Dublin (UCD), where he graduated in 1957. He was dismissed from Scoil Eoin Báiste on the orders of The Most Rev. Dr John Charles McQuaid, Archbishop of Dublin.

He was first published by the London literary and arts review, X, which published in 1961 an extract from his first – abandoned – novel, The End or Beginning of Love.

McGahern married his first wife, Finnish-born Annikki Laaksi, in 1965 and in the same year published his second novel, The Dark, which was banned by the Irish Censorship Board for its alleged pornographic content along with its implied sexual abuse by the protagonist's father. Due to the controversy which was stirred by the book's publication, McGahern was dismissed from his teaching post and forced to move to England where he worked in a variety of jobs, including on building sites, before returning to Ireland to live and work on a small farm that he bought near Fenagh, a village near Ballinamore, in the south-east of County Leitrim. The farm was located in the townland of Aughaboneill, just south of Foxfield and a short distance south-west of Fenagh. The farm overlooked Lough Rowan or Rowan Lough, usually known locally as Laura Lake.

McGahern divorced in 1969, and married Madeline Green in 1973.

He died from cancer in the Mater Hospital in Dublin on 30 March 2006, aged 71. He is buried in St Patrick's Church, Aughawillan, alongside his mother.

== Novels ==
McGahern's six novels, drawing inspiration from personal life experience, detail the trials of developing a sense of self in mid-twentieth century Ireland.

=== The early novels: The Barracks and The Dark ===
His first published novel, The Barracks (1963), chronicles the life of the barracks' Garda sergeant's second wife, Elizabeth Reegan, who is in declining health due to cancer. The Barracks was adapted for the stage in 1969 by Hugh Leonard.

His second book, The Dark (1965), tracks the progression of a young boy as he moves through the education system in rural Ireland. The main character, young Mahoney, while maintaining his academic prowess, experiences a strained relationship with his father, old Mahoney – who beats him and the other children – as well as indecision about what to do with his life after secondary school. Young Mahoney's attitude towards his father evolves over the large timespan covered within the novel from fear and hatred towards greater acceptance.

Note: The Barracks and The Dark came from McGahern's re-writing of his first, unpublished, novel, The End or Beginning of Love.

=== Mid-career literature: The Leavetaking and The Pornographer ===
The next novel, The Leavetaking (1975), introduces the reader to Patrick Moran, a young schoolteacher in Dublin. The novel is set during his last day in the school. He will be formally fired that night for having married a divorced non-Catholic woman during a leave of absence year. The novel is divided into two parts: both of which are essentially flashbacks. Part 1 covers the teacher's childhood up to the moment of his mother's death. Like McGahern himself, Patrick had promised his mother that he would become a priest and, as he is unable or unwilling to do so, instead becomes a schoolteacher (often referred to as "the second priesthood" in mid-twentieth century Ireland). Part 2 flashes back to how he came to meet his wife, how exactly the church authorities fired him, and his ultimate dismissal by the Catholic Church authorities, the formal authority within the vast majority of primary schools on the island of Ireland at the time. The book is a close reflection on McGahern's own experience of being dismissed from his teaching post in the early 1960s for much the same reasons as Patrick Moran, as well as the scandal caused by his second book, The Dark, for its many sexual references.

The Pornographer (published in 1979) details the life of the novel's protagonist who lives in Dublin and writes pornography for a living. He begins a sexual relationship with a young woman called Josephine, and when Josephine subsequently becomes pregnant, the "pornographer" voices his contempt towards the birth of the baby, and indeed his relationship with the child's mother. As with McGahern's previous novel, this work treats the subject of death by cancer – the protagonist's aunt in this case is dying in hospital – as well as visits to rural Ireland.

=== Back to the country: Amongst Women and That They May Face the Rising Sun (By The Lake) ===
His fifth, and perhaps best-known, novel is Amongst Women (1990), which marks a return to the North Roscommon/South Leitrim setting after two Dublin/London books. It details the story of Michael Moran, an IRA veteran of the Irish War of Independence and the Irish Civil War, who now dominates his family in the unforgiving farmlands surrounding Mohill in the south of County Leitrim. The book shows a detailed and understanding portrayal of a hardened, and unapologetically idealistic, protagonist in the figure of an ageing Moran. An ex-IRA commander, Moran detests the "small-minded gangsters" who now run the country for which he fought. Though Moran's presence surely dominates the novel, the positive attributes of his stern moralism and sense of self-worth are passed on to his children, who become successful adults (both emotionally and financially) in both Dublin and London alike. Once again, it seems to fit into a sequence, with the progressive male character most closely reflected by Luke, who left home, emigrated to London, and refuses to get close to his father again. One may view McGahern's portrayal of the Moran household as the house he left behind with the remaining kids being brought up by his father, his father's remarriage, and his young brother's struggles with his father and school. In 2015, The Guardian listed Amongst Women as 97 in its list of the 100 best novels.

His final novel, That They May Face the Rising Sun, which was published in 2002 (published in the United States as By the Lake), is a portrait of a year in the life of a rural lakeside community. The novel explores the meaning of prosaic lives and life in (a now-past life) in rural Ireland. He said "the ordinary fascinates me" and "the ordinary is the most precious thing in life". The main characters have – just like McGahern and his wife – returned from London to live on a farm. Most of the violence of the father figure has disappeared now, and life in the country seems much more relaxed and prosperous than in The Dark or Amongst Women, as McGahern now writes in a twenty-first century Ireland.

== Other writing ==
Several collections of short stories by McGahern were published, as well as Love of the World, a collection of non-fiction essays. His autobiography, Memoir (All Will be Well: a Memoir in the US), was published in 2005 a year before his death outlining influential moments in his life which critics often speculated were present within his earlier work. Andrew Motion wrote "In a tremendously distinguished career, he has never written more movingly, or with a sharper eye".

== Influence ==
McGahern's work has been very influential in Ireland and elsewhere. A younger generation of Irish writers, such as Colm Tóibín, as well as contemporaries such as Eamonn McGrath, have been influenced by his writing.

His work has been translated into other languages, in particular French.

== Awards and honours ==
McGahern was a member of the Irish Arts honorary organisation Aosdána and was appointed a Chevalier dans l'Ordre des Arts et des Lettres. He was visiting professor at Colgate University and the University of Notre Dame (United States), University of Victoria (Canada), Durham University (Great Britain), UCD and NUI Galway (Ireland). His other awards included:

- 1962 AE Memorial Award (Irish Arts Council)
- 1964 Macauley Fellowship (Irish Arts Council)
- 1979 FRSL
- 1985 Irish-American Foundation Award
- 1990 Irish Times/Aer Lingus Fiction Award
- 1990 Shortlisted for Man Booker Prize
- 1991 LittD Trinity College Dublin
- 1994 LittD University College Galway
- 1995 Prix Ecureuil de Littérature Etrangère Bordeaux
- 2003 LittD St. Patrick's College, Drumcondra, Dublin
- 2003 Irish PEN Award
- 2003 Hughes & Hughes/Irish Novel
- 2007 National Archive Choice

He was also a farmer in his native South Leitrim, although he liked to joke that it was the writing that kept the farm rather than the farming revenue allowing him to write.

== Archives ==
- List for John McGahern's Literary Archive at National University of Ireland, Galway

== List of works ==
=== Novels ===
- The Barracks (1963) AE Memorial Award, McCauley Fellowship.
- The Dark (1965)
- The Leavetaking (1975)
- The Pornographer (1979)
- Amongst Women (1990), Irish Times/Aer Lingus Literary Award (1991), GPA Award (1992), nominated for the Booker Prize (1990).
- That They May Face the Rising Sun (2002), Irish Novel of the Year (2003), nominated for the International Dublin Literary Award. Published in the United States under the title By the Lake (2002)

=== Non-fiction ===
- Memoir (2005). Published in the United States in 2006 under the title All Will Be Well.
- Love of the World (2009) Collected non-fiction and essays.

=== Short story collections ===
- Nightlines (1970)
- Getting Through (1978)
- The Stoat (1978)
- High Ground (1985)
- The Collected Stories (1992), includes the three previous volumes of short stories (some of the stories appear in a slightly different form) and two additional stories – "The Creamery Manager" and "The Country Funeral". The former first appeared in Krina (1989).
- Creatures of the Earth: New and Selected Stories (2006) contains several stories collected in The Collected Stories, here revised by McGahern for the last time. Again two new stories, "Creatures of the Earth" and "Love of the World", are included.

=== Drama ===
- Sinclair (1971) (radio, adaptation of the short story, 'Why We're Here')
- The Barracks (1971) (radio, adaptation of the novel of the same name)
- The Sisters (1971) (television, adaptation of the James Joyce short story of the same name)
- Swallows (1975) (television, adaptation of the short story of the same name)
- The Rockingham Shoot (1987) (television)
- The Power of Darkness (1991) (theatre)

=== Short stories ===
Title	Publication	Collected in
"Coming Into His Kingdom"	Voices: Contemporary Fiction, ed. Rubens (1963)	Nightlines
"Strandhill, the Sea" a.k.a. "Summer at Strandhill"	The New Yorker (September 21, 1963)	Nightlines
"Why We're Here"	The Review (April 1968)	Nightlines
"Christmas"	The Irish Press (April 27, 1968)	Nightlines
"Korea"	The Atlantic (October 1969)	Nightlines
"The Key" a.k.a. "Bomb Box"	The Listener (December 1969)	Nightlines
"My Love, My Umbrella"	The London Magazine (1970)	Nightlines
"Wheels"	Encounter (April 1970)	Nightlines
"The Recruiting Officer"	The Atlantic (July 1970)	Nightlines
"Hearts of Oak and Bellies of Brass"	Nightlines (February 1971)	Nightlines
"Peaches"	Nightlines (February 1971)	Nightlines
"Lavin"	Nightlines (February 1971)	Nightlines
"Swallows"	The London Magazine (December 1971)	Getting Through
"The Beginning of an Idea"	The New Review (August 1974)	Getting Through
"The Stoat"	Vogue (October 1, 1974)	Getting Through
"A Slip-Up"	Strand (June 1975)	Getting Through
"Faith, Hope, and Charity"	The New Review (October 1975)	Getting Through
"All Sorts of Impossible Things"	Encounter (December 1975)	Getting Through
"The Wine Breath"	The New Yorker (April 4, 1977)	Getting Through
"Sierra Leone"	The New Yorker (August 22, 1977)	Getting Through
"Gold Watch"	The New Yorker (March 17, 1980)	Getting Through
"Doorways"	Getting Through (July 1980)	Getting Through
"Along the Edges"	Getting Through (July 1980)	Getting Through
"High Ground"	The New Yorker (March 22, 1982)	High Ground
"Parachutes"	Encounter (February 1983)	High Ground
"Crossing the Line"	The New Yorker (August 1, 1983)	High Ground
"A Ballad"	Ireland and the Arts (1983)	High Ground
"Oldfashioned"	Threshold (Winter 1984)	High Ground
"Eddie Mac"	The New Yorker (December 3, 1984)	High Ground
"Like All Other Men"	The Yale Review (April 1985)	High Ground
"Bank Holiday"	The Irish Times (August 9, 1985)	High Ground
"The Conversion of William Kirkwood"	High Ground (1987)	High Ground
"The Creamery Manager"	Krino (Autumn 1987)	The Collected Stories
"The County Funeral"	The Collected Stories (1993)	The Collected Stories
"Creatures of the Earth"	Granta (Winter 1994)	Creatures of the Earth
"Love of the World"	Granta (Fall 1997)	Creatures of the Earth
"The White Boat"	New Writing #6 (1997)	-

=== Films ===
Amongst Women was filmed as a television mini-series in 1998, directed by Tom Cairns, and starring Tony Doyle as Moran.

One of McGahern's best-known short stories, "Korea", was made into a feature film of the same name directed by Cathal Black and produced by Darryl Collins in 1995. In 1996, Korea won the Asta Nielsen Best Film Award at the Copenhagen Film Festival and was runner-up for the Audience Prize at the Seattle Film Festival.

A film adaptation of That They May Face the Rising Sun premiered in 2023, directed by Pat Collins. The film won 11 awards, including Best Film, at the 2024 Irish Film & Television Awards.
