= Earth's Seasonal Secrets =

- Cover art using international title
- Genre: Nature documentary
- Narrated by: Andrew Scott
- Country of origin: United Kingdom
- Original language: English

Production
- Production company: BBC Natural History Unit

Original release
- Network: BBC One
- Release: 2016

Earth's Seasonal Secrets is a 2016 British BBC nature documentary about the four seasons and their effect on life, broadcast on BBC One. It was released as Earth's Great Seasons in some countries.
