= Song of Granite =

2017 film

- Film poster
- Directed by: Pat Collins
- Written by: Pat Collins; Eoghan Mac Giolla Bhríde; Sharon Whooley
- Produced by: Alan Maher; Jessie Fisk
- Starring: Mícheál Ó Confhaola; Colm Seoighe
- Cinematography: Richard Kendrick
- Edited by: Tadhg O’Sullivan
- Distributed by: Wildcard Distribution (Ireland)
- Release dates: 12 March 2017 (SXSW); 11 July 2017 (Ireland)
- Running time: 104 minutes
- Countries: Ireland; Canada
- Languages: Irish; English

Song of Granite is a 2017 Irish biographical drama film directed by Pat Collins. It was selected as the Irish entry for the Best Foreign Language Film at the 90th Academy Awards, but it was not nominated.

== Plot ==
The origins and rise of sean-nós singer Joe Heaney are charted.

== Cast ==
- Colm Seoighe as Joe 1
- Mícheál Ó Confhaola as Joe 2
- Macdara Ó Fátharta as Joe 3
- Leni Parker as Mrs. Rosenblatt
- Alain Goulem as Alan Lomax
- Jaren Cerf as Rosie

== See also ==
- List of submissions to the 90th Academy Awards for Best Foreign Language Film
- List of Irish submissions for the Academy Award for Best Foreign Language Film
