= Cootehall =

Cootehall Uachtar Thíre
- Village
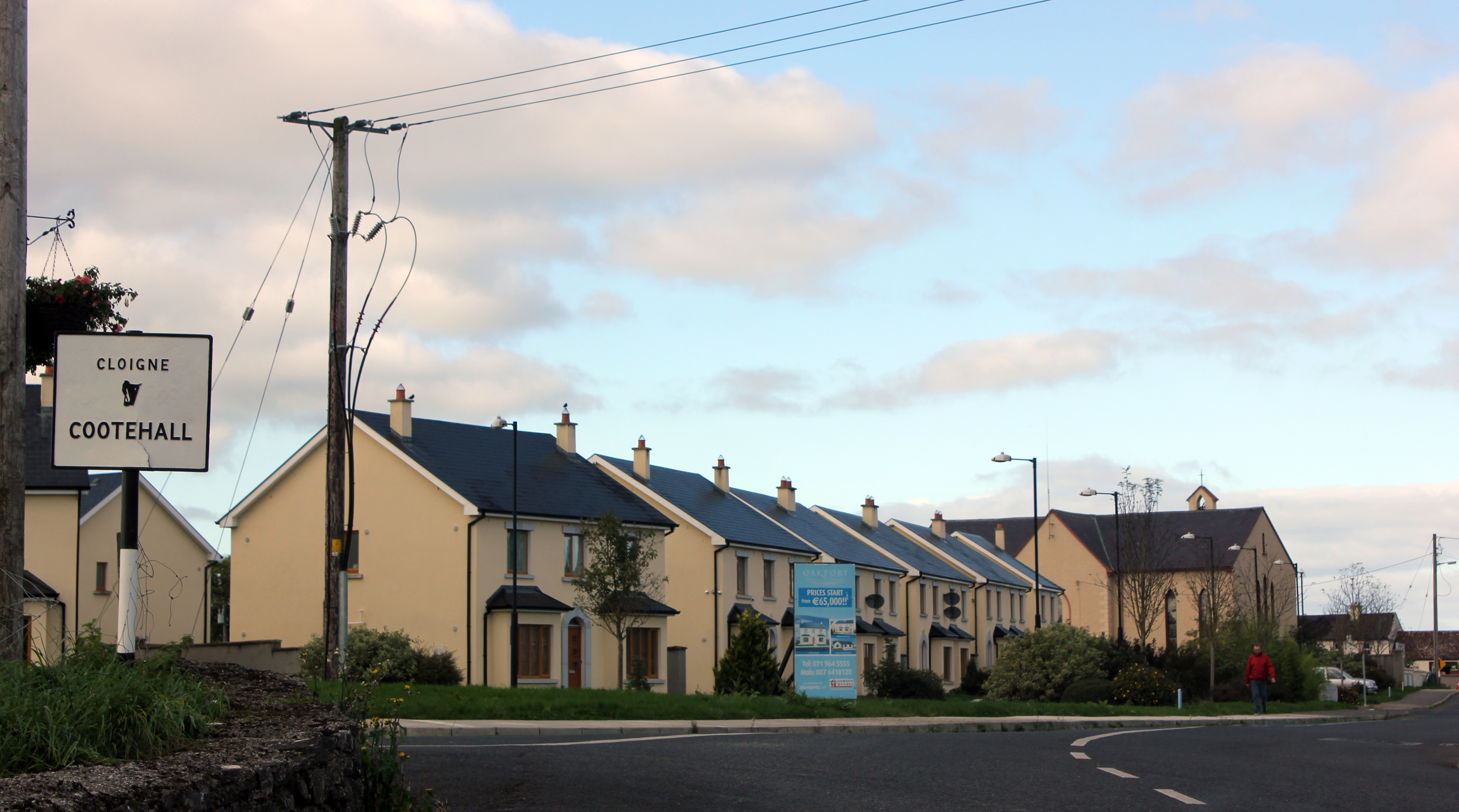
- New housing in Cootehall

- Location in Ireland
- Coordinates: 53°59′04″N 8°09′30″W
- Country: Ireland
- Province: Connacht
- County: County Roscommon
- Elevation: 52 m (171 ft)

Population (2016)
  - Total: 184
- Time zone: UTC+0 (WET)
  - Summer (DST): UTC+1 (IST (WEST))

Cootehall (Irish: Uachtar Thíre, meaning 'Upper Territory', also Cloigne) is a village in County Roscommon, Ireland. It is located on the River Boyle, between Boyle and Carrick-on-Shannon near Lough Key Forest Park in the north of the county.

Cootehall lies 4 kilometres off the N4 road from Dublin to Sligo and between the R284 and R285 regional roads.

The Boyle River, which flows through Cootehall, connects the village with Lough Key to the west and the River Shannon to the east.

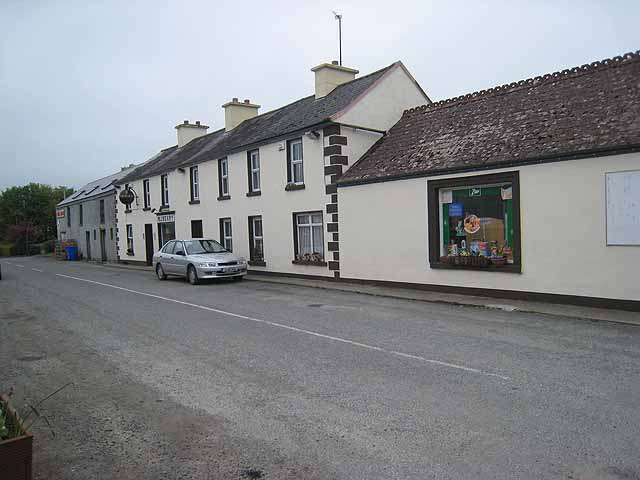

== History ==
Cootehall was formerly called Urtaheera, or O'Mulloy's Hall, and was, early in the 17th century, together with the manor attached to it, the property of William, styled "the Great O'Mulloy;" but in the war of 1641 it came into the possession of the English Cromwellian, Chidley Coote, nephew of the first Earl of Mountrath, and from that family took its present name.

Sir Charles Coote Snr (d.1642) was Provost Marshal of Connacht from 1605. His big opportunity for enrichment came when he was appointed to a Commission for land titles. Under this disguise, he acquired Clegna on the left bank of the Boyle River which he renamed Cootehall and here built the finest standing example of English Colonial Architecture in the north of the county.

== House ==
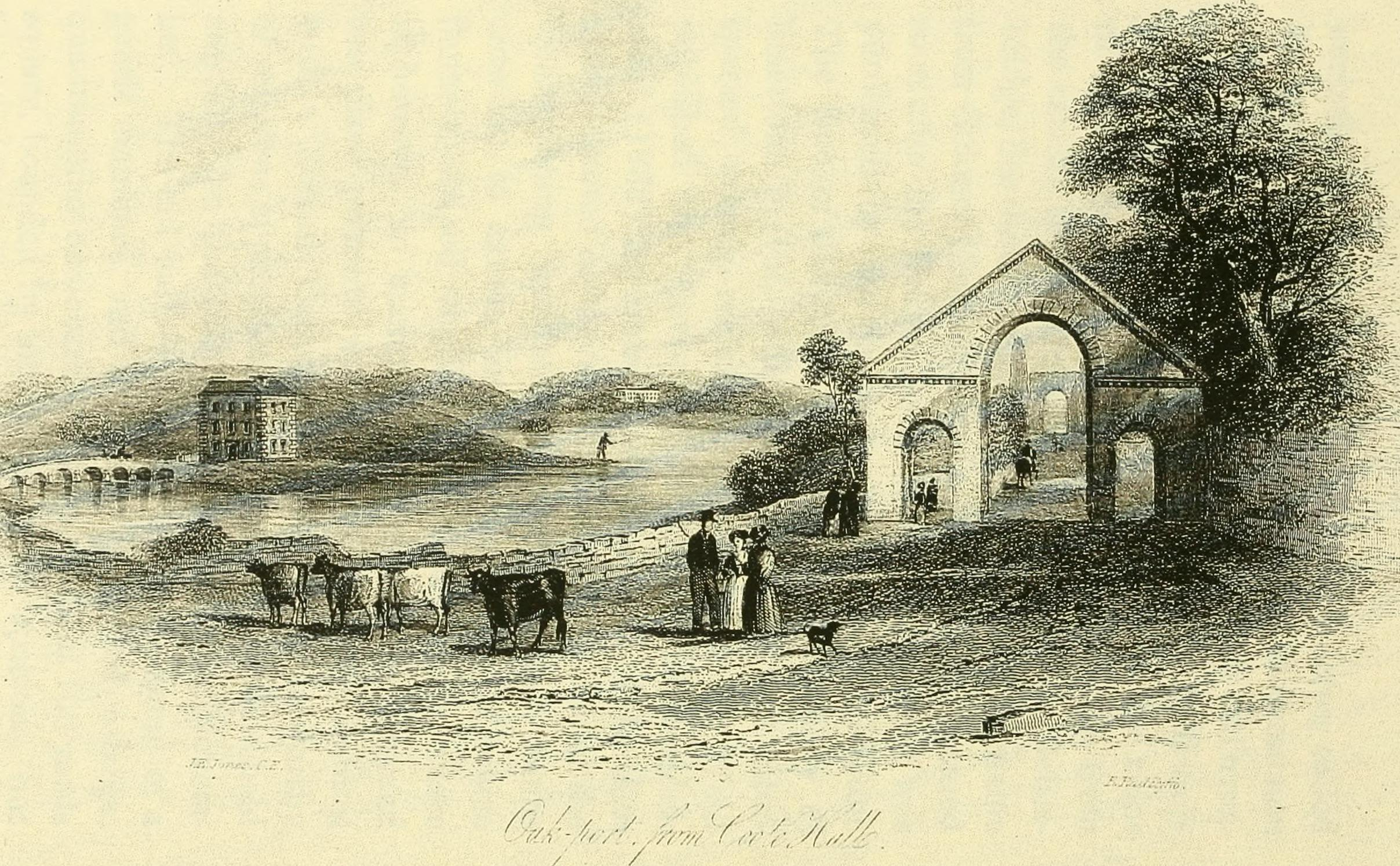
Oakport Lough, viewed from Coote Hall (1845 engraving).

In the 17th and 18th centuries, the house, also called "Cootehall", was built and occupied by the Coote family. The piper Turlough O'Carolan is recorded as having visited the house and composed tunes for the occupants.

At some point in the 18th century, the house was occupied by Maurice O'Connor. Maurice O'Connor bought Coote Hall from the Coote family for £75,000 or £76,000 around 1725. In the 19th century, Coothall was part of the Kilronan Castle Estate which belonged to the Tenison family. A detailed survey of Coothall was made in 1862 for E.K. Tenison. The house at Coothall was occupied by Mr Barton as a tenant of the Kilronan Estate.

Lady Louisa Tenison mentioned Coothall in her will of 1878 which is currently in the National Archives of Ireland.

The house survives to the present day.

Celtic Tiger Growth

Cootehall was a hamlet until the 2000s when a number of housing developments were built during the Irish property bubble. It is now a larger village in terms of the number of houses, with a mix of different housing types which suit the locality, within a well designed central triangle, and attractively situated on the Boyle river adjacent 2 small lakes..

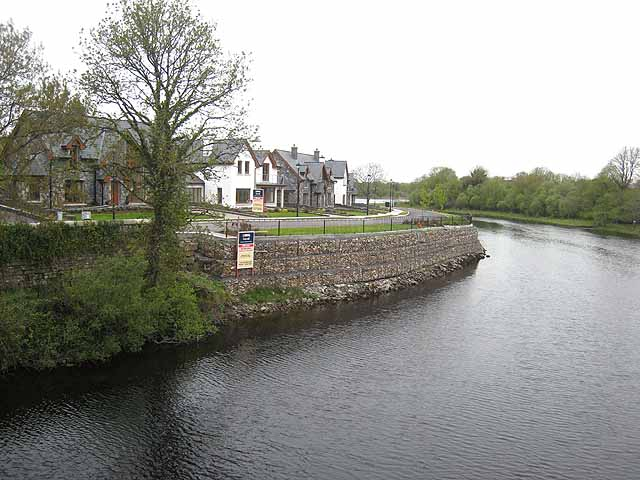

== People ==
- Writer John McGahern's father was based in the police station in Cootehall which inspired his novel The Barracks.
- The politician Seán Doherty was born and raised in Cootehall.
- Former president of Ireland, Mary McAleese resides close to the village.

== See also ==
- List of towns and villages in Ireland
