= That They May Face the Rising Sun (film) =

Irish drama film

- Directed by: Pat Collins
- Screenplay by: Pat Collins; Eamon Little
- Based on: That They May Face the Rising Sun by John McGahern
- Produced by: Tina O’Reilly; Brendan J. Byrne
- Starring: Barry Ward; Anna Bederke
- Cinematography: Richard Kendrick
- Edited by: Keith Walsh
- Music by: Irene Buckley; Linda Buckley
- Production companies: South Wind Blows; Cyprus Avenue Films; Harvest Films
- Release date: 2023
- Running time: 111 minutes
- Country: Ireland
- Language: English

That They May Face the Rising Sun is a 2023 Irish film directed by Pat Collins. It is an adaptation of the 2002 novel of the same name by John McGahern. The film was nominated for 11 awards, winning Best Film, at the 2024 Irish Film & Television Awards.

== Premise ==
In the 1980s, a young couple Joe and Kate leave London for Ireland to live in Joe's native County Leitrim.

== Cast ==
- Barry Ward as Joe
- Anna Bederke as Kate
- Lalor Roddy as Patrick
- Ruth McCabe as Mary
- Phillip Dolan as Jamesie
- Sean McGinley as Johnny
- Brendan Conroy as Bill

== Production ==
The adaptation of the John McGahern 2002 novel was directed and co-written by Pat Collins whose previous documentary work includes John McGahern: A Private World (2005). The script was co-written by Eamon Little. The cast has Barry Ward, Anna Bederke in the lead roles and also includes Lalor Roddy, Sean McGinley, Ruth McCabe and first-time actor Phillip Dolan.

Principal photography took place in Connemara in County Galway, along the Mayo border.

== Release ==
The premiered at the London Film Festival in 2023.

== Reception ==
On the review aggregator site Rotten Tomatoes, the film currently holds a score of 97% based on 33 critic reviews.

The film was nominated for 11 awards, winning for Best Film, at the Irish Film & Television Awards in April 2024.
