= Korea (1995 film) =

- Directed by: Cathal Black
- Screenplay by: Joe O'Byrne
- Story by: John McGahern
- Produced by: Darryl Collins
- Starring: Donal Donnelly; Andrew Scott; Fiona Molony
- Release dates: September 12, 1995 (Toronto); January 5, 1996
- Running time: 87 min
- Country: Ireland
- Language: English

Korea is a 1995 Irish feature film directed by Cathal Black based on a short story by John McGahern.

== Plot ==
The film is about the relationship between father and son, John and Eamon Doyle. Based on a short story by John McGahern, it is set in rural Ireland during the 1950s, a period of mass emigration and social change. Young Irish emigrants, on arriving in America, have been enlisted and sent to fight in the Korean War. One of those emigrants, Luke Moran, dies in Korea and his home village is awash with rumours about the compensation the Moran family received on Luke's death. John Doyle hears the rumours but remains silent. Ben Moran is John's arch-enemy, a feud traced back to the Civil War. Eamon comforts and falls in love with Una Moran.

== Cast ==
- Donal Donnelly as John Doyle
- Andrew Scott as Eamon Doyle
- Fiona Molony as Una Moran
- Vass Anderson as Ben Moran
- Eileen Ward as Mrs. Moran
- Pat Fitzpatrick as Mick Farrell
- Christopher Callery as Barman
- Sadie Maguire as Mrs. Maguire
- Peter MacNamee as Postman
- Gus Ward as Doctor Whelan
- Stephen Holland as Luke Moran
- Siobhán Dooney as Mary Doyle
- Bill Hickey as Priest
- Cathal Farrelly as American attache
- Gary Reilly as 1st Altar Boy
- Charles McGuinness as 2nd Altar Boy
- Franci Smith as Veteran
- Dan Moynihan as Veteran
- Mick O'Brien as Veteran
- Catriona Canavan as Sean nós singer
- Tommy McArdle as 1st Farmer
- Hugh B. O'Brien as 2nd Farmer
- Jim Wilkinson as Ticket Agent
- Michael Thornton as ESB Speaker

== Accolades ==
- Amiens International Film Festival — Special Jury Award (Cathal Black)
