= Eamonn McGrath =

Irish author

Eamonn McGrath (14 June 1929 – 5 May 2008) was an Irish author.

== Life ==
Born the third of four children, McGrath spent his childhood in a small farming community near Taghmon, County Wexford. He was educated by the Augustinians at the Good Counsel School in New Ross and after that was offered a place at University College Galway, where he graduated in English and Irish. He was a fellow student of the poet Breandán Ó hEithir.

Soon after graduation he fell ill with Tuberculosis and spent nearly three years recovering in a sanitarium in Brownswood, County Wexford. McGrath recovered fully, thanks to the enlightened health policies of Noel Browne during the inter-party government of 1948-51.

On regaining his health, he took up a teaching post in Carrickmacross, County Monaghan, where he married Joan Fahey in 1959. In 1963 he moved to another teaching post in Clonakilty, County Cork and remained there for the rest of his life. He also worked as a supervising examiner for the Department of Education in Leaving Certificate English and also set the papers for these exams in the 1970s and 1980s.

He died in Clonakilty Hospital, on 5 May 2008, aged 78. He is buried in St. Mary's Cemetery, Clonakilty alongside his wife Joan and his mother.

== Works ==
Much of McGrath's work is inspired by his own life experiences, and is influenced by contemporaries such as John McGahern and Patrick Kavanagh, who was a fixture in the pubs of Carrickmacross during McGrath's tenure in the local school.

His first published and best known novel, Honour Thy Father (published in the United States as The Clay Grew Tall) is a coming-of-age novel set in 1950s rural Ireland, where John Foley, a boy who lives in the shadow of his boisterous father, struggles to follow an academic path in a house where farming and the priesthood are the only respected professions. The story follows John's development through boarding school and examines the changing relationship with his father as he enters adulthood. The novel was first published in 1970, and later republished in 1990 after it had been serialized on RTÉ Radio.

His second novel, The Charnel House follows life in a 1950s-era TB sanitarium, from which young engineering student Richard Cogley sees little chance of escape. Lyrically written, it is one of few novels that examines the social effects of the white plague in Ireland, a central theme of the book being the indifference of society to the suffering of others.

His third novel, The Fish in the Stone, concentrates on the subject of incest in rural Ireland. The novel follows the story of Mary Ennis, the young daughter of an estranged couple who is subjected to abuse by her father, which continues unnoticed by her pious mother whose standing in the local community takes precedence over the unfulfilled needs of her family. The book examines the relationship between daughter and father as it progresses through self-deceit and emotional blackmail to an ugly end.

== Bibliography ==
Novels

- Honour Thy Father (Dublin, Figgis, 1970 / New York, Herder & Herder, 1972 (as The Clay Grew Tall)[reissued Belfast, The Blackstaff Press,1990])
- The Charnel House (The Blackstaff Press, 1990/US, Dufour Editions, 1990)
- The Fish in the Stone (The Blackstaff Press, 1994)
