= That They May Face the Rising Sun =

Irish Novel

- Author: John McGahern
- Language: English
- Genre: Novel
- Set in: Ireland, 1970s
- Publication date: 2003
- Publication place: Ireland
- Dewey Decimal: 820
- LC Class: PR6063.A2176 B9

That They May Face the Rising Sun, the sixth and final novel by John McGahern, is a critically acclaimed work, winning the Irish Book Awards in 2003 and earning a nomination for the International Dublin Literary Award. In the United States, the novel was published under the title By the Lake. The novel is a portrait of a year in the life of a rural Irish lakeside community.

== Plot summary ==
The novel portrays a year in the life of a rural lakeside community, employing a unique and somewhat deceptive narrative structure devoid of traditional chapters or breaks. The story unfolds in a circular and repetitive manner, resembling a stream of consciousness narrative. The setting is a remote and sparsely populated area near the village of Fenagh in the south of County Leitrim, located between Carrick-on-Shannon and the border with County Fermanagh. The lives of the community members are framed within the cycle of a year, encompassing events such as haymaking, market days, lambing, and various celebrations like Christmas, Monaghan Day in February, Easter. The narrative delves into the daily routines, seasons, weather, and the natural environment.

The novel introduces a wide array of characters, such as Joe and Kate Ruttledge, who have relocated to Ireland from London in pursuit of a different life. Additionally, readers encounter John Quinn, a character driven by unwavering determination in his pursuit of romantic interests, Johnny, who left for England two decades earlier in search of love, and Jimmy Joe McKiernan, who holds the dual roles of an auctioneer and an undertaker, while also heading the local IRA. The community's spirit is embodied by the gentle Jamesie and his wife Mary, who, though they have never left the lake, possess an intimate knowledge of everything that has ever stirred or moved in their surroundings.

As the narrative unfolds, the drama of a year in the lives of these and many other characters comes to life through their actions, the rituals of work, religious observances, and leisure activities.

== Critical reaction ==
The novel received critical acclaim, by its recognition at the Irish Book Awards and its nomination for the International Dublin Literary Award in 2003.

Alison Light of The Independent stated of the work:

McGahern conjures the warmth and decency of working people without sentimentality. He gives them dignity, while keeping his distance. Ultimately he celebrates those who are well off in the best sense because they are glad to be alive.

== Film adaptation ==
A film adaptation directed by Pat Collins premiered in 2023.
