= Cathal Black =

Irish filmmaker (b.1952)

- Born: 1952 (age 73–74)
- Occupations: Director, producer, writer

Cathal Black (born 1952) is an Irish film director, writer, and producer.

== Background ==
Black was born in Dublin, Ireland and grew up in Phibsborough. His father worked at the Guinness Brewery. Black's mother died when he was around 9 or 10 years old. His father remarried and the family moved to Galway for a period before returning to Dublin. Black has a twin brother.

== Career ==
Black was elected as a member of Aosdána in 2000.

== Filmography ==
=== Director ===
- 2018 - Five Red Roses - one for every syllable of your name
- 2014 - Butterfly (TV Short)
- 2007 - Learning Gravity (a.k.a. the Undertaking)
- 1999 - Love & Rage
- 1995 - Korea
- 1984 - Pigs
- 1981 - Our Boys (Short)
- 1976 - Wheels (Short)

=== Producer ===
- 2018 - Five Red Roses - one for every syllable of your name (Documentary) (producer)
- 2014 - Butterfly (TV Short) (producer)
- 2012 - Irish Folk Furniture (Documentary short) (producer)
- 1999 - Love & Rage (co-producer)
- 1995 - Korea (executive producer)
- 1976 - Wheels (Short) (producer)

=== Writer ===
- 2007 - Learning Gravity (a.k.a. the Undertaking)
- 1976 - Wheels (Short) (screenplay)
