= The Pornographer (book) =

Irish novel

- Author: John McGahern
- Language: English
- Genre: Fiction
- Publication date: 1979
- Pages: 252

The Pornographer is the fourth novel by Irish author John McGahern, first published in 1979. The novel delves into the complex themes of human relationships, sexuality, and mortality with a nuanced narrative that intertwines the mundane with the profound. The Pornographer delves into Michael's dual roles as a writer of pornographic fiction and his struggles with love and sensitivity.

== Plot summary ==
The Pornographer tells the story of Michael, a writer of pornographic fiction living in Dublin, who crafts a world of idealized sex through his characters Colonel Grimshaw and Mavis Carmichael. Despite his proficiency in depicting eroticism, Michael struggles with his personal relationships, particularly with an older woman, Josephine, aged 38, who falls in love with him.

Michael's brutal, insensitive honesty towards Josephine contrasts sharply with how he treats his dying aunt in hospital, who knows nothing of his work or inner world. Meanwhile, his employer, Maloney, a failed poet and prominent figure in the pornography industry, gradually gains influence over Michael's tumultuous life.

The narrative explores the juxtaposition of opposites, with themes of sex and death interwoven throughout. Michael, a thirty-year-old alcoholic, navigates through his emotionally indifferent existence, grappling with Josephine's pregnancy and the societal expectations of 1970s Ireland.

As Michael reflects on his life and relationships, he begins to question what it means to truly engage with life and to do right by others.

== Critical reaction ==
The novel was met with critical acclaim, praised for its compelling portrayal of an isolated existential hero navigating the complexities of Dublin life. Colm Tóibín, reflecting on the novel, expressed its impact, stating:

So when The Pornographer appeared me and my colleagues devoured it. This isolated existential hero producing his pornography in Dublin was electrifying for us. Certainly much more so than, say, the new Martin Amis novel, which was a big turnaround.

Alice Adams of The New York Times, praised it as "an often amusing, sometimes sexy, and always wonderfully written example" that subverts expectations. Adams notes that the novel's central fantasy provides a contrast to readers' own untidy fantasies, offering relief from the incomprehensibility of their dreams. She highlights the novel's departure from traditional narratives where the humor or pathos derives from the contrast between outer and inner lives, suggesting that The Pornographer offers a unique exploration of secret lives that may or may not be exposed through collision with reality.
