= The Vertical Hour =

2006 play by David Hare

The Vertical Hour is a play by David Hare. The play addresses the relationship of characters with opposing views on the 2003 invasion of Iraq, and also explores psychological tension between public lives and private lives.

== Productions ==
The play made its world premiere on Broadway at the Music Box Theatre on 30 November 2006, directed by Sam Mendes. The cast featured Bill Nighy, Julianne Moore in her Broadway debut, and Andrew Scott. It closed on 11 March 2007, after 23 previews and 117 performances.

The play received its UK premiere at the Royal Court Theatre on 17 January 2008 in a production directed by Jeremy Herrin. The principal actors were Indira Varma, Anton Lesser and Tom Riley. It was the fastest selling new play in the Royal Court's history and was broadcast on BBC Radio Three on 25 May 2008.

The Vertical Hour was revived at the off-West End Park Theatre in a new production directed by Nigel Douglas. The show opened in September 2014 and was produced by Oliver Taheri Productions. The cast featured Peter Davison as Oliver Lucas, Finlay Robertson as Phillip, and Thusitha Jayasundera as Nadia Blye.

On 10 September 2014, The Vertical Hour had its South African premiere at Theatre on the Bay, Camps Bay, Cape Town. The play was directed by Fred Abrahamse and produced by Pieter Toerien. The production transferred to the Studio Theatre at Montecasino, Johannesburg, from 1 October 2014 - 8 November.

The Vertical Hour enjoyed a revival at Brighton Fringe, 1–5 June 2021 at Rialto Theatre, Brighton. Produced by Pretty Villain Productions it received a 5* review from Broadway Baby and 'Outstanding' from Fringe Review.

== Principal roles and original cast ==
Role	Premiere cast, 30 November 2006 Broadway, Music Box Theater	UK premiere cast, 17 January 2008 London, Royal Court Theatre	RSA premiere cast, 10 August 2014 Cape Town, Theatre on the Bay
Nadia Blye	Julianne Moore	Indira Varma	Jackie Rens (Jacqueline Maré Rens)
Oliver Lucas	Bill Nighy	Anton Lesser	Michael Richard
Philip Lucas	Andrew Scott	Tom Riley	Richard Gau
Dennis Dutton	Dan Bittner	Joseph Kloska	Jaco van Rensburg
Terri Scholes	Rutina Wesley	Wunmi Mosaku	Sinakho Zo' Zokufa

== Theme ==
Hare considers the work to be a companion piece to his play Stuff Happens, about the Iraq War, but on an intimate scale. In the private conversations of a war correspondent, who covered the conflict, and her boyfriend's father, Hare believes that he presents the theme of national responsibility for war with relevance equal to his epic piece depicting soldiers and statesmen preparing for invasion.

== Synopsis ==
Nadia Blye is a professor at Yale University, a former war correspondent during the 1990s Balkan conflicts, and a supporter of the 2003 invasion of Iraq. As the play begins, she is in conference with one of her students, Dennis Dutton, over the merits of one of his writing assignments. During the course of the conversation, Dennis reveals that he is infatuated with Nadia, even though he has a fiancée. Distressed, Nadia dismisses Dennis from her office.

Nadia and her English boyfriend, Philip Lucas, travel to Shropshire to visit Philip's father, Oliver, a physician, so that Nadia can meet Oliver for the first time. Philip tells Nadia that his father is a habitual womanizer and is opposed to the Iraq war. Oliver and Nadia debate the merits of the invasion of Iraq and of intervention by one country into the affairs of another country in general. Nadia justifies the invasion based on the earlier oppression of the Iraqi people, and her observations that the Western powers did nothing to alleviate the suffering of the Balkan peoples in the 1990s. In the play, her character is described as having visited US President George W. Bush to offer advice on foreign policy related to the Middle East and Iraq. She acknowledges that the aftermath of the invasion was undesirable, but that this did not negate the original rationale. Oliver counters that the US and UK invading forces had no plans for the reconstruction of Iraq and that the rationale for the invasion, purported weapons of mass destruction, was false and unjustified.

During the course of the discussion, the strained relationship between Oliver and Philip is revealed to Nadia. An unspoken attraction develops between Oliver and Nadia, of which Philip is suspicious. Philip clearly tells Nadia that his father is trying to seduce her, which leads to strain between Nadia and Philip. Nadia also learns of Oliver's "open marriage" and extramarital affairs, one of which led to the accidental death of one of Oliver's mistresses. This caused Oliver to give up his London practice and home, and to move to the country in isolation.

The play ends as Nadia is in conference with another student, Terri Scholes, criticising Terri's latest writing assignment for a class. Terri tells Nadia that she plans to leave Yale because her boyfriend has broken up with her. Nadia commiserates that she, too, has recently broken up with a boyfriend. She convinces Terri to wait a day before finalizing her decision to leave Yale, but reveals that she herself will be leaving Yale to return to being a war correspondent.
