= The Dark (McGahern novel) =

Book by John McGahern

- First edition cover
- Author: John McGahern
- Language: English
- Publisher: Faber and Faber
- Publication date: 1965
- Publication place: Ireland
- Media type: Print (hardback, paperback)
- Pages: 191 pages (paperback)

The Dark is the second novel by Irish writer John McGahern, published in 1965.

== Plot introduction ==
The Dark is set in Ireland's rural north-west, and it focuses on an adolescent and his emerging sexuality, as seen through the lens of the strained and complex relationship he has with his father, Mahoney.
