= Memoir (McGahern book) =

2005 novel by John McGahern

- First edition (h/b)
- Author: John McGahern
- Language: English
- Publisher: Faber and Faber
- Publication date: 2005
- Publication place: Ireland
- Media type: Print (paperback, hardback)
- Pages: 272
- ISBN: 0-571-22810-0

Memoir (published in North America as All Will Be Well) is an autobiographical account of the childhood of Irish writer John McGahern. It was published in 2005, and the writer died in 2006. It recalls, amongst other things, his formative years in County Leitrim, Ireland, the death of his beloved mother, Susan, and his relationship with his dark and enigmatic father. Themes from his childhood experiences run throughout his canon of fiction.

== Editions ==
- Memoir. Faber and Faber. 2005. pp. 272. ISBN 0-571-22810-0.
- All Will Be Well: A Memoir. New York: Knopf. 2006. p. 304. ISBN 1-4000-4496-0.
