= Eolais mac Biobhsach =

Chieftain in Gaelic Ireland

Conmaicne Réin
- Reign: c. 890–940 AD
- Successor: Maolmuire mac Eolais
- Born: c. 870 AD; Conmaicne Réin, County Leitrim IE
- Died: Ireland
- Issue: Brocan, Anbeith, MaolMuire.
- House: Conmaicne Réin
- Father: Biobhsach mac Croman Oge
- Religion: Christian

Eolais mac Biobhsach (alias 'Irish: Eolus' "knowledge", anglicized "Wallis", "Olis" or "Olus" fl. AD 900) was a chieftain of 10th century Gaelic Ireland. He is noted as the first "full chieftain of the Conmaicne" of present-day south county Leitrim, and parts of west County Longford. His descendants are known as "the Muintir Eolais".

== Biography ==
Eolais was born into a Túath of the Conmaicne settled in present-day south county Leitrim, in the second half of the 9th century. As an adult, he became chieftain of his sept. A charismatic leader, he became the first full chieftain of the "Conmaicne Réin" c. AD 900.

He married, having at least three sons, named "Brocan", the ancestor of Shanley; "Anbeith", the ancestor of Mac Garry; and "Maolmuire", lord of Conmaicne Réin and ancestor of Mag Raghnaill (anglicised Mac Rannell, Reynolds). (Note: The O'Hart pedigrees show Eolais being closely related to the ancestors of Quinn and Farrell of Longford, and Mulvey of Leitrim.) Ódhrán Ua hEolais, a famous scribe of Clonmacnoise, was probably his grandson.

Eolais's death is not recorded by the Irish Annals, but probably occurred between A.D. 920–960.

== Legacy ==
Eolais Mac Biobhsach is the ancestor of the Muintir Eolais who were the most famous of the ancient Leitrim sub-septs of the Conmaicne territories of modern-day Leitrim (barony) and Mohill (barony). The primary sept of Eolais today are Reynolds, Mulvey, Shanley, and McGarry. From the 11th to 17th centuries, the Irish: "Muintir Eolais" ("'tribe of Eolais'") ruled most of the territory of present-day south county Leitrim. Place names preserve his memory. The townland of Corryolus (Irish: Coraidh Eolais, Eoluis, lit. 'weir of Eolais') located in the town of Carrick on Shannon clearly retains his name. In the remote mountainous Cuilcagh-Anierin uplands, the oligotrophic lake named "Lough Munter Eolas" marks a borderline between west Cavan and south Leitrim.

== Tributes ==
A well established Leitrim-Longford traditional fiddle group, trained by a Fr. Quinn since 1966, adopted the name "Ceolus" preserving his name, (Note: "A contraction of the Irish words "Ceol" meaning "music" and "Muintir Eoluis", which means "the people descended from Eolus", the first Conmhaicne chief of the area of South Leitrim. The band was christened Ceolus on January 31st, 1990.") and they play music garnered from local manuscripts going back almost two hundred years.

== Surname ==
O'Donovan claimed the family name (Irish: Ó hEóluis "descendant of Eolais") is still found anglicised as "Olus" or "Olis". In 1566 two instances of the surname corrupted as "Oelase" and "Olase", are found in the Irish Fiants for Leinster. The surname must be very rare.

== See also ==
- Muintir Eolais
- Ódhrán Ua hEolais
- Flannchad Ua hEolais

== Notes and references ==
=== Primary sources ===
- O'Daly, Aengus; Mangan, James Clarence; O'Donovan, John; O'Daly, Ferdoragh (1852). The tribes of Ireland: a satire (PDF). p. 35.

=== Secondary sources ===
- Petrie, George (1872). Christian Inscriptions in the Irish Language. Vol. 1. Royal historical and archaeological association of Ireland, University Press. p. 61, f131.
- O'Hart, John (1876). "Irish pedigrees: or, The origin and stem of the Irish nation" (PDF). Dublin : M. H. Gill. pp. 135–136.
- Deputy Keeper (1879). Deputy Keeper of Public Records in Ireland: eleventh report (PDF). Vol. Parliamentary Papers, Session 1878-79, Vol. XXXIX, p.581. HSMO.
- Woulfe, Patrick (1923). "Ó hEÓLUIS".
- Hardiman, James (1831). "Irish Minstrelsy, Or Bardic Remains of Ireland". Robins. pp. xlvi (46).
- O'Donovan, John, ed. (1856). Annála Rioghachta Éireann. Annals of the Kingdom of Ireland by the Four Masters ... with a Translation and Copious Notes. 7 vols. Translated by O'Donovan (2nd ed.). Dublin: Royal Irish Academy. CELT editions. Full scans at Internet Archive: Vol. 1; Vol. 2; Vol. 3; Vol. 4; Vol. 5; Vol. 6; Indices.
- Ward, Conor (2016). Scordatura in the Irish Traditional Fiddle Music of Longford and South Leitrim (PDF). p. 12. Archived from the original (PDF) on 29 October 2016.
- Templan, Paul (2010). "Irish Hill and Mountain Names" (PDF). mountainviews.ie. p. 14.
- O'Clery, Michael; O'Clery, Cucogry; O'Mulconry, Ferfeasa; O'Duigenan, Cucogry; O'Clery, Conary (1856). John O'Donovan (ed.). Annala Rioghachta Eireann: Annals of the kingdom of Ireland (PDF). Vol. 1. Dublin : Hodges, Smith.
- Joyce, P. W. (Patrick Weston) (1913). Irish names of places (PDF). Vol. v.3. Dublin : Phoenix.
- Ó Duígeannáin, Mícheál (1934). "Notes on the History of the Kingdom of Bréifne". The Journal of the Royal Society of Antiquaries of Ireland. The Journal of the Royal Society of Antiquaries of Ireland, Volumes 64-65 (1) (Digitized 2008 from original at the University of California ed.). Royal Society of Antiquaries of Ireland: 113–140. JSTOR 25513764.
