= Muintir Eolais =

Nobles in Gaelic Ireland

Munitir Eolais
- 6th–7th century – 1603
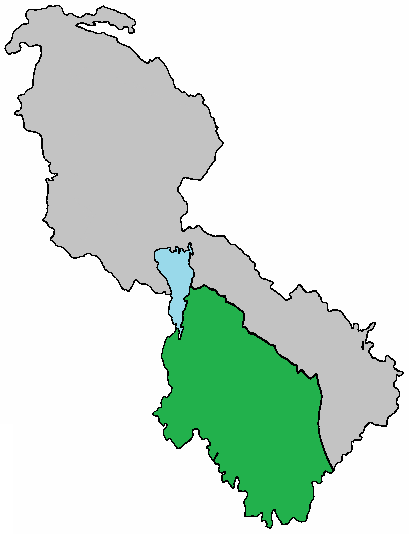
- Territory of Muintir Eolais (Green) within County Leitrim
- Status: Tuath
- Religion: Roman Catholic
- Government: Elective monarchy
- Taoiseach
  - 890–940: Eolais mac Biobhsach
  - 1553–1580: Sean Reynolds

Area
  - Total: 500 km^{2} (190 sq mi)

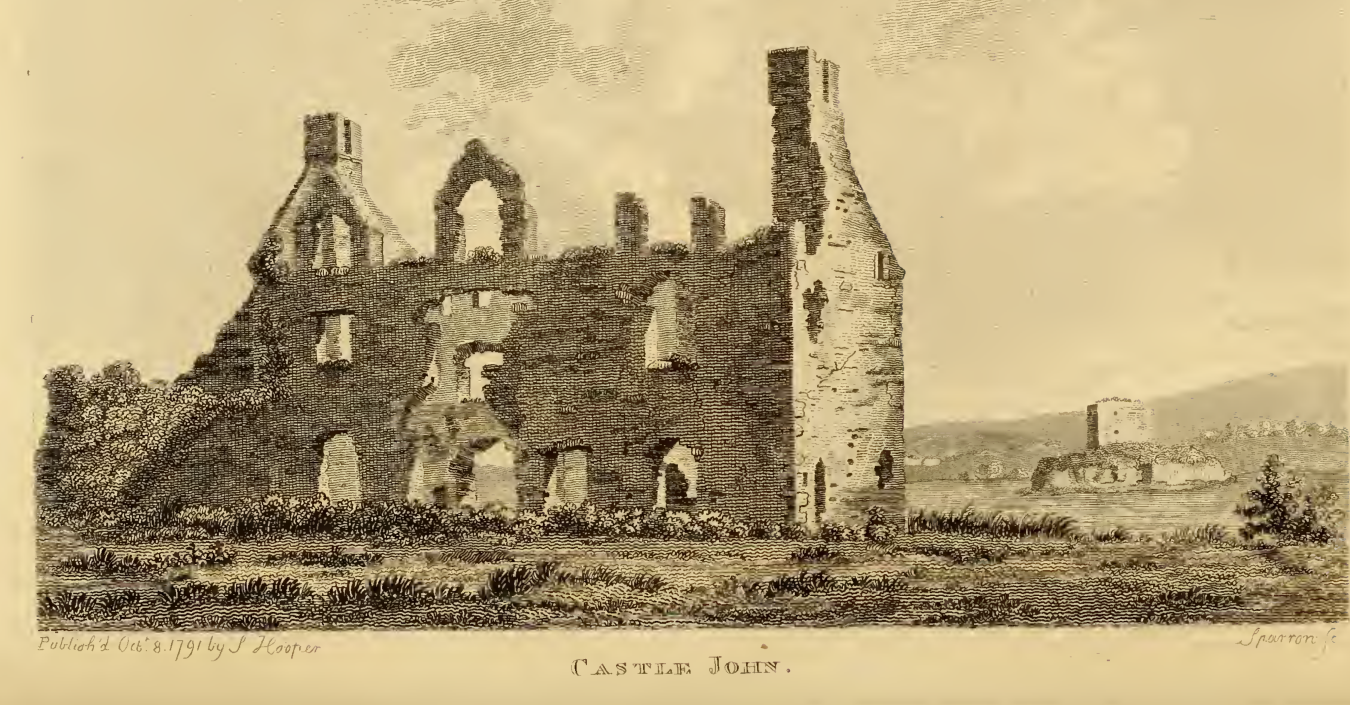
Castle John and Jail Island at Lough Scur circa 1791

The Muintir Eolais of Conmaicne Réin were nobles of Gaelic Ireland. For seven hundred years from the 8th century, they lived in and ruled an area roughly conterminous with present-day south County Leitrim. Their territory comprised the lands named Maigh Nissi and Maigh Rein, today the baronies of Leitrim and Mohill respectively.

The Mag Raghnaill, O'Mulvey, and Mac Shanley rule became increasingly fragmented throughout the 16th century. The tuath of the Muintir Eolais collapsed with Irish defeat in the Nine Years' War, and became largely forgotten with the English occupation of Ireland.

== Rise of Muintir Eolais (c. 900) ==
The dynasty of Muintir Eolais originated with Eolais mac Biobhsach, chieftain of the Conmaicne circa 900 AD. Little is known about Eolais. The word eolas itself means 'knowledge' in the Irish language. After his death his followers and territory are known as the Muintir Eolais (people/descendants of Eolas).

=== Founding families ===
The principal Muintir Eolais families were Mac Raghnaills, with castles at Lough Rynn, Lough Scur, and Leitrim Village, the O'Mulvey sept of Maigh Nissi, O'Moran of AttyRory, Mac Shanley's of Dromod, and the Mac Garry sept.

O'Hart states Eolais had at least three sons: Brocan was ancestor of Shanley, Anbeith was ancestor of Mac Garry, and Maolmuire was both lord of Conmaicne Réin and ancestor of Mag Raghnaill (Reynolds). All were related to the ancestors of Quinn and Farrell of Longford.

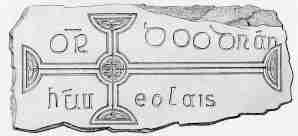
'Pray for Ódhrán, descendant of Eolas'

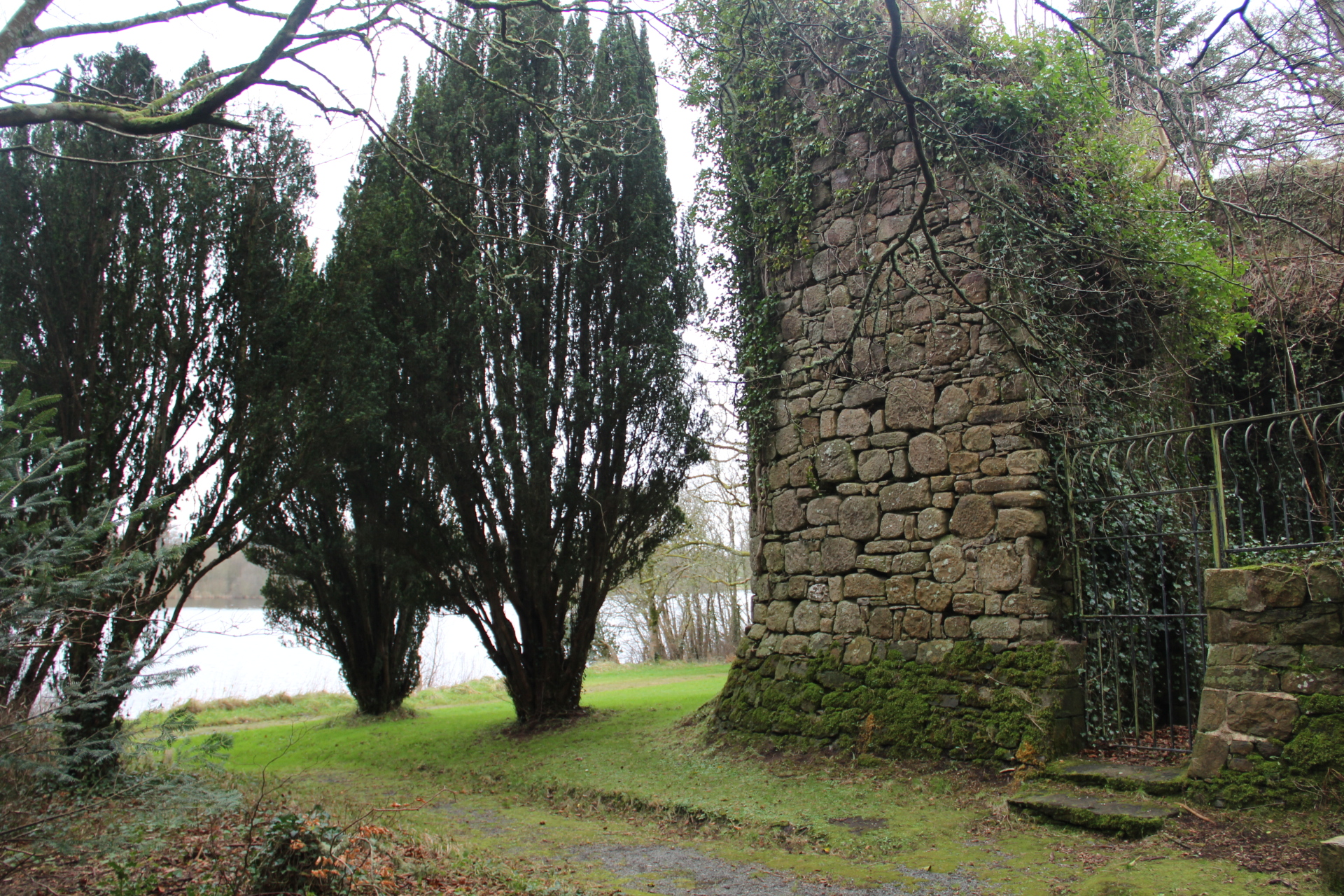
Castle at Lough Rinn

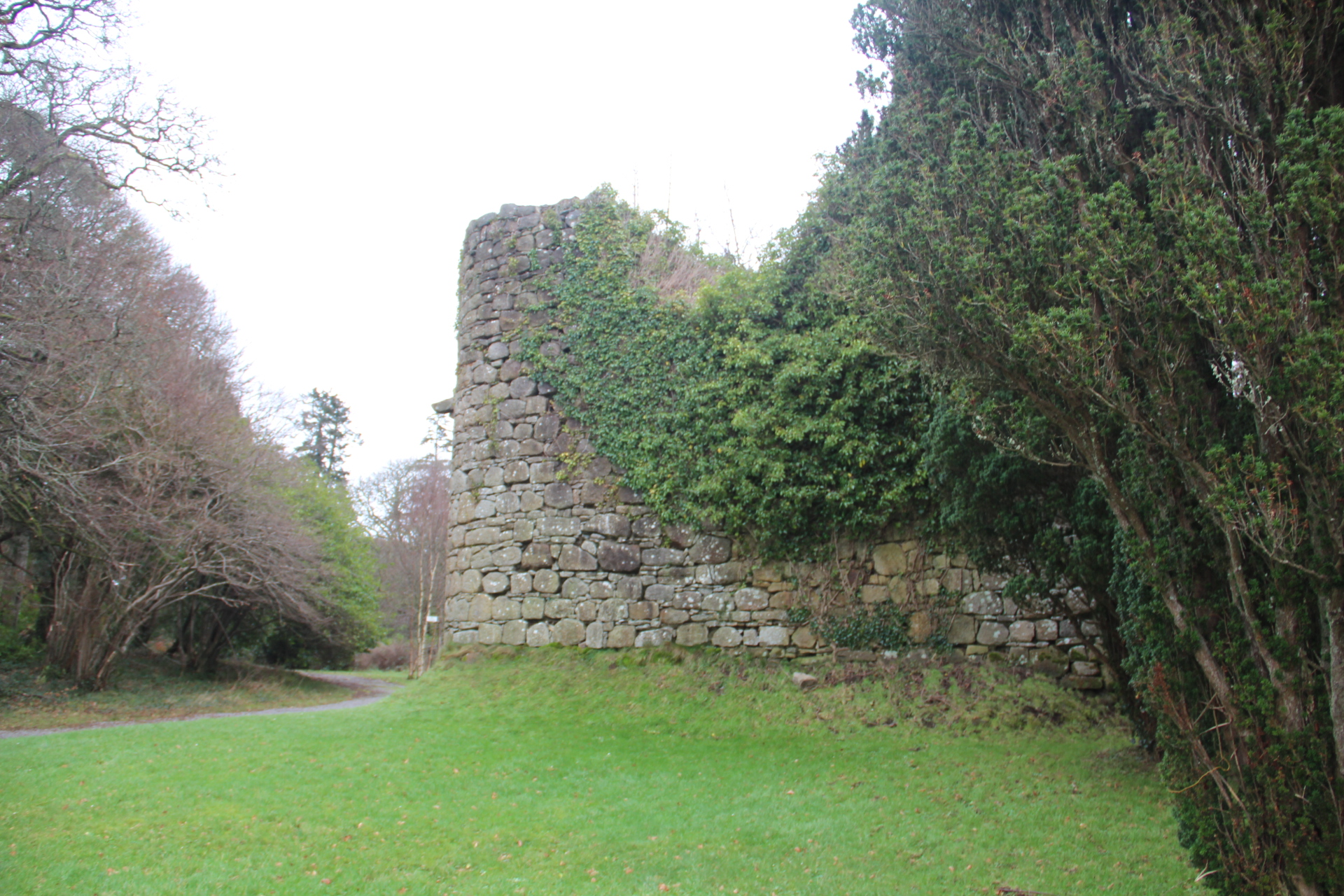
Castle at Lough Rinn

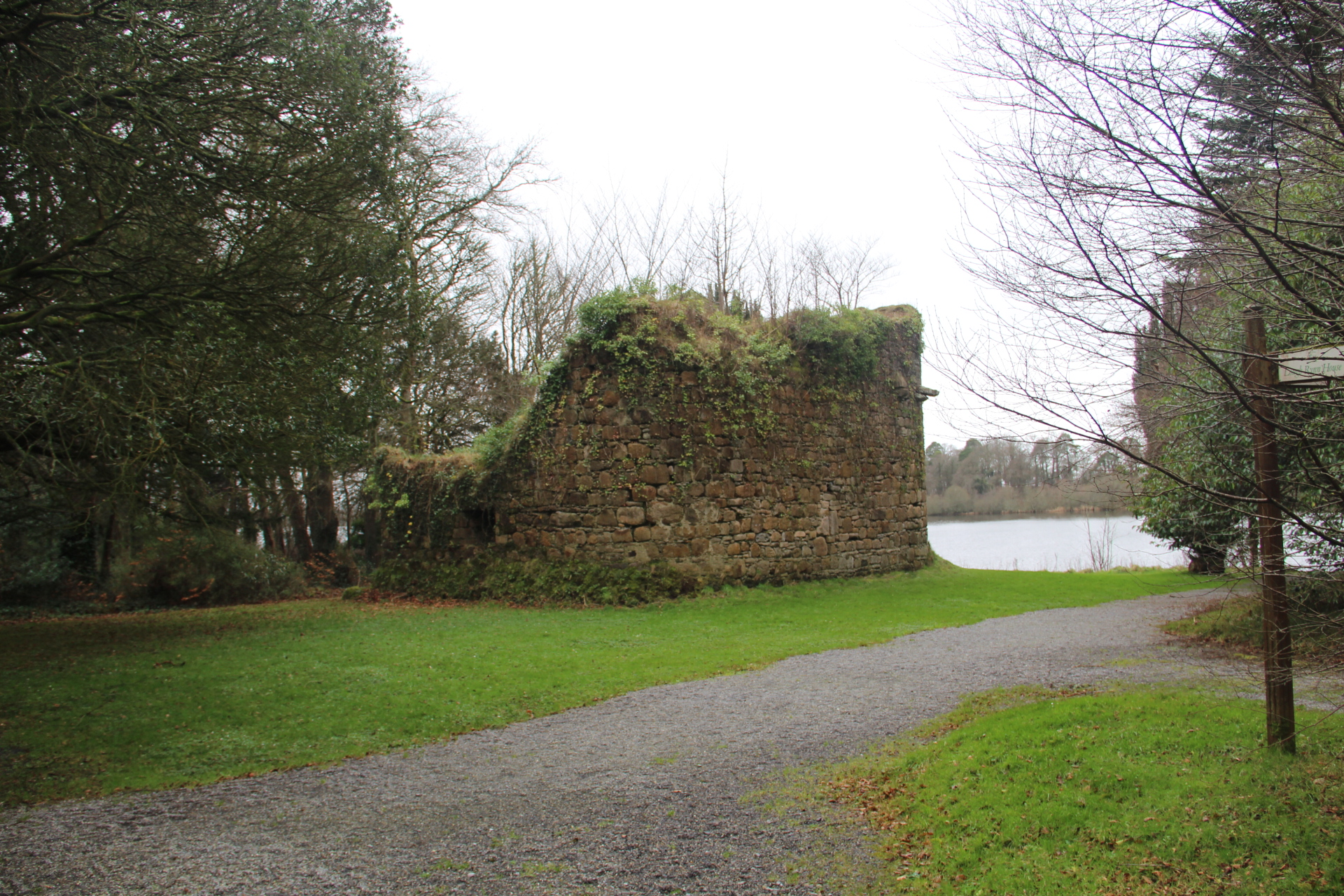
Castle at Lough Rinn

== Normans ==
=== Invasion (1245) ===
Muintir Eolais was briefly occupied during the Norman invasion of Ireland. According to the Irish Annals: "1245: The castle of Ath-an-chip, on the borders of Moy Nisse, was erected by Miles Mac Costello". Moy-Nissi on the eastern side of the Shannon river, was the Irish name given to the barony of Leitrim. The Anglo-Normans were known as clann Costello (Irish: Mac Goisdealbh). (Note: "In the year 1172, Henry II. granted to ... Gilbert de Angulo or Nangle, Magherigallen, now the barony of Morgallion, in Meath. Jocelin, son of Gilbert Nangle, obtained Navan and Ardbraccan .... Many of the Nangles took the Irish name of Mac Costello, and from them the barony of Costello in Mayo derived its name". O'Clery, Connellan & MacDermott (1846), p. 64.)

=== Expulsion (1247) ===
In 1247, the Anglo-Normans were defeated by Ó Conchobair and MacRaghnaill forces. The Anglo-Norman Clann Costello were expelled from Muintir Eolais. The entries in the Annals of Lough Ce for 1245 and 1247 suggest a decisive defeat of Mac Costello (also called De Angulo or Nangle), and halted Norman claims to the territory of Muintir Eolais (until 1551;).

=== Battle of AthanChip (1270) ===
In 1270, the Anglo-Normans were again defeated by the Irish forces of Connacht at the Battle of Áth an Chip. MacNamee states "where Ath an Chip was is not certain; to the present writer the evidence would seem to point to Battle Bridge". The battle occurred at Drumhierney townland in Muintir Eolais. (Note: Drumhierney translates from the Irish: Droim Thiarnaigh roughly meaning the "ridge of the Lord or Master". See also Tierney.) In Irish "Ath-an-cip" means a fording point on a river, and battle-bridge marks a shallow fording point on the Shannon connecting Drumhierney (Leitrim village) with Battlebridge (county Roscommon) townlands.

== Fall of Muintir Eolais (1535–90) ==
Events of the 16th century combined with the Tudor conquest of Ireland brought an eventual downfall of the Muintir Eolais.

=== Kildare alliance (1530–35) ===
In the 16th century the Muintir Eolais aligned themselves to the Kildare camp, the most powerful family in Ireland. And their kinsman Charles Reynolds had a close association with the Earl. Specifically, on 5 November 1530, the Muintir Eolais signed an agreement to pay rent to Gerald Fitzgerald, 9th Earl of Kildare, in return for military protection. The arrangement benefited both parties.

This is the covenant and indenture that is between Gerald Fitzgerald, Earl of Kildare, and Magradhnaill [Mac Rannall] - namely, Phelim MacConcobhair Mac Concobhair Mac Murchadh, and Maelruana Mac Owen Mac William, and Ir Mac Brian Mac Owny, and James Mac Maelruana Mac Fearghal, by will and consent of each of them and of the chief men of clan Melachlain, collectively: to wit that a shilling for every quarter of land which belongs [pays rent] to O'Ruark or Magradhnaill shall be paid to the Earl every year and every All Hallows in consideration of the Earl's defending and assisting them against all men subject to his authority. The faith of God and the oaths of the Church are sworn by Magradhnaill and the aforesaid chief men in pledge of fulfilment of the Earl. The promise and troth of the Earl, on the other hand, are plighted to them for his fulfilment thereof. The witnesses present at the agreement were the EArl himself, and William Walsh, and James Boyce, and William Tuite, and Concobhair Mac Cluruadh. It was the aforesaid chief men who dictated the agreement, and Mailin-oge Mac Mailin O'Mailconery, wrote it in their presence, on the fifth day of the month of November, at Maynooth. The eight King Henry was King of England that year, Anno Domini 1530. Magradhnaill had no seal, and he ordered the Seal of the College of Maynooth to be affixed to his indenture. The Earl subjects to a penalty of three marks any one who is indebted who shall refuse a pledge to the steward, to wit Concobhair Mac Culruadh: one-half to Magradhnaill and the chief men who made this covenant, and the other half to the Earl.

However, by 1533, Henry VIII of England wanted the Englishman, William Skeffington, as replacement Lord of Ireland. Gerald Fitzgerald was imprisoned in the Tower of London in spring 1534, provoking his son "Silken" Thomas into rebellion. The revolt was quickly crushed and the Earldom of Kildare extinguished. The Muintir Eolais lost a critical ally, leaving them politically and militarily vulnerable.

=== Reynolds treason (1536) ===
Charles Reynolds (1497–1535) of Muintir Eolais was a central figure in the rebellion. Dispatched as envoy to Scotland, Charles V of Spain, and Rome, he successfully persuaded the Pope to excommunicate Henry VIII of England Reynolds, before his sudden death in Rome. Reynolds was posthumously attainted for treason in 1536. His grave slab exists in Rome.

=== O'Rourke (1540) ===
The Annals of the Four Masters states "1540: the castle of Leitrim was erected by O'Rourke (Brian, the son of Owen) while a great war was waged against him on every side, namely, in Moylurg, Muintir-Eolais, and Breifny-O'Reilly". The Muintir Eolais, and allies MacDermot from Moylurgh, violently objected to the land grab but failed to oust O'Rourke from Leitrim Village in MoyNissi ("barony of Leitrim"). O'Rourke used this presence in MoyNissi to lobby the English to recognise his claim of Lordship over both Breifny O'Rourke (north Leitrim) and Muintir Eolais (south Leitrim). This claim is an origin of the county of Leitrim ("O'Rourke's country"), but his presence at MoyNissi in "Mag Raghnaill country" was resented, and resisted in a 1556 legal Declaration.

=== Norman rent (1551) ===
In 1551, Thomas Nangle the baron of Navan made submissions to the English council of Ireland that Mag Raghnaill was refusing to pay him 100 kine yearly, plus knights fees, due to his ancestors. The Nangle claims were based on a Norman grant dating from 1220–21 granting a tract comprising all the lands of MoyRein ("barony of Mohill"), and part of county Cavan, to Philip de Angulo, a Norman adventurer. Mag Raghnaill denied the claims arguing no such duty had been paid from the beginning of time. However both sides compromised and consented to the Council decision to awarded 6 pounds annual duty to the Baron.

=== Declaration (1552) ===
On 5 December 1552, the Muintir Eolais, with the approval of the monasteries of Conmaiche, signed a legally binding document, written in neat Irish, deeding the title of chieftain and protector of Muintir Eolais to Sean ("Shane") Reynolds of Clonduff in County Offaly, on condition he lobby the English on their behalf and protect their ancestral lands. The document shows Muintir Eolais opposition to "any of the O'Rourkes". This is the earliest documented mention of "county of Leitrim". The following is the only known translation:

This is the deed of gift of the two[1] Mac Ranalds; to wit, Cahal, son of Conachar Mac Ranald, Toraylach and Gerald Magranal, heads and chiefs of their kindred, with the consent of their brethren and followers in Munterolish, to John Magranal, of Claduff, in the King's county, and to his heirs:—

Know all men, now and in the time that is yet to come, that we, Cahal, son of Conachar Magranal, of the Hill of Innis Morrin, in the county of Leitrim; Toraylach Magranal, of Drumard, chiefs of our kindred; Ferdorcha Magranal, of Drumsna, and of Lochdaw; Melachlin, son of Hubert Magranal, of Corsparrow; Moroch, son of Teig, of Cloondaa; Ir, son of Donal, of Dulach; Teig, son of William, of Screbach; Toraylach Magranal, of Loch Connow; Owen Magranal, of Loch Scur; Toraylach O'Mulvey, of Loch Crew, chief of his kindred; Teig, son of John, of Acha Cashel; Dermid Magranal, of Cool Cadarna; Cormac Magranal, of Loch Cool da 'Iach; Dermid Magranal, of Mongoarsach; Edmond Magranal, of Mohill; Jeffrey, son of Conachar, of Anagh Kinca; Toraylach Magranal, of Loch Irill; Brian Gruama, the son of Hugh, of Drumlara; Farrell Duff, the son of Hugh, of Corleih; Donacha Grana, son of Giolla Gruama, of Stookisha; Conachar, son of Giolla Gruama, of Duffcarrick; Rurie Og O'Moran, of Ty Rurie; Toraylach O'Beirne, of Mullanmoy; Gerald, son of Moylan Magranal, of Clooncalry; Melachlin, son of Conachar Magranal, of Cloonclyfa; Cahal, son of Dermid Magranal, of Rusc, alias Gort an Yure; Ir, son of Edmond, of Rathbeh; Melachlin Modara Magranal, of the Point; Edmond Mac Shanly, of Drumode Mac Shanly; Moroch, son of Melachlin, of Drumkeely; Dermid, son of the Prior, of Clonee and of Innis Rusc; Moroch Magranal, of Drumherk; Teig O'Histellan, of Drumeen; Teig Roe Magarry, of Towlag;

with the consent of our kinsmen and followers in Munterolish, for many reasons, for ourselves and our heirs, HAVE GIVEN to John Magranal, of Claduff, in the King's county, and to his heirs for ever, the yearly sum of forty-two pounds, money of England, to be raised and levied upon our aforesaid lands in Munterolish, and upon any other lands claimed by us, or in our occupation, to be paid at two terms in the year, to wit, one half on the first of May, (Beiltin,) and the other half at All Hallowntide, (Samhan;) and in case of any delay occurring as to the full payment of the aforesaid sum at the time specified, then this is our agreement with the said John, for ourselves and our heirs, with John and his heirs, that he and they, or the attorneys sent by them, shall have power to enter into our said country of Munterolish, and into our aforesaid lands, and to levy a distress, (pledge,) and to take the same with them, and to keep it until full payment is made, to wit, of forty-two pounds, and of arrears, if any such should be—

ON CONDITION, that he, the said John, shall be our protector and chieftain over us; and also that he shall repair from time to time to Dublin, to advocate our cause before the lords justices and council, at our sole charge, over and above the aforesaid sum, which we give him on account of his services; and on condition that the said John shall not put any of us out of our lands; and we promise to behave ourselves most dutifully to him, and not to adhere to any of the O'Rourkes.

In witness whereof we have put our hands and seals to this writing the 5th day of December. 1552. CATHAL MAC CONOCHAR.

There were present at this agreement, when it was ratified, and when it was interchanged, and when the seals were put upon it, to wit, God in the first place; Richard O'Hivganane; Anlan O'Molloy; Toraylach Mac Ranald; the two sons of Teig, the son of Ayan, to wit, Owen and William; Kiruah Mac Manus; Gerald, deacon of Feana; Cormac, deacon of Cloon; Conachar Mac Giolla Sooly; Manus Mac Giolla Roe; Owen O'Colla.

=== Twilight of a nation (1553–90) ===
Sean Reynolds of Clonduff was the agreed chieftain of Muintir Eolais between 1553–80. In 1570 he built a 'Castle' at Gowly peninsula ("castle island") at Lough Scur in county Leitrim. (Note: The suggestion by Grose Castle Sean was erected by O'Rourke, is unfounded.) Castle John was three stories high and surrounded by good rock land. It was residence to Sean "of the heads" Reynolds (d. 1619), Humphrey his son (d. 1661), and lastly James (d. 1729) who abandoned the castle at some point. (Note: James's son, George Nugent Reynolds Senior was shot and killed by Robert Keon on the morning of 16 October 1786. Keon was tried and executed in 1788 for his murder.)

In 1580, Lough-Scur was attacked and taken by McDermot of Moylurg, historically a strong ally of the Muintir Eolais. The Annals of Loch Cé state: "1580: Loch-an-scuir was taken by Cathal Dubh, son of Brian Mac Diarmada; and Maelsechlainn, son of Mag Ranaill, was killed there. A depredation was committed by Brian Mac Diarmada upon Mag Ranaill, and burnings besides." The disturbances suggest a Muintir Eolais inspired revolt against the rule of Sean Reynolds.

== English invasion (1590) ==
In 1590, an "immense" English army invaded south county Leitrim during the nine years war, which ended in defeat for gaelic Ireland. Thereafter, the tuath ('nation') of Muintir Eolais was extinguished, and the formation of county Leitrim marked the onset of an English occupation lasting over three hundred years.

== Lough Scur Reynolds ==
From the end of the Nine Years' War up until 1729 the Reynolds dynasty of Lough Scur owned large estates in south Leitrim.

=== Seóin "of the heads" (d. 1629) ===
The notoriety of Shane Reynolds of Lough Scur is now legendary. Tradition says he was called Seán Na gCheann ('Sean of the heads') on account of all the men beheaded (or because he was head chieftain). He maintained an army of "two hundred men", and his reputation for jailing rent defaulters, and beheading people for minor offences, was widely feared. Folklore claims Sean (or Seóin) was killed by a soldier from Longford avenging his sister's death on Prison Island. His son Maelsechlainn was killed in 1580. His grandson Sean was captured during the 1641 Rebellion, held captive by rebels, tortured and probably executed.

Tradition recalls this Sean Reynolds of Lough Scur invited the other Muintir Eolais chieftains to his castle for a reconciliation meeting before, in cruel betrayal, beheading them all. This alleged massacre would have occurred sometime late 16th century. (Note: A massacre circa 1580 would help explain the unprecedented attack on Reynolds by McDermot of Moylurg. However the Irish Annals has no record of this massacre.)

The Book of Fenagh has the following poem line: "Then will come a Gall-Gaidhel; By whom thy place [Fenagh] will be destroyed." A marginal note, added by Tadhg Ó Rodaighe (fl. 1690), translates as following:

This Gall-Gaidhel [foreign-Gael] was John og MagRaghnaill, son of Eoghan, son of John. An Englishwoman, i.e. a Russell, was his mother. His father was a true Gaidhel. English tutelage he also received in London. It was he who first brought foreigners to Fidhnacha, after Cromwell's wars. A.D. 1652, to settle the country. He was not of the number himself; but it was by his advice, at least, they came. And he was himself sorry for it afterwards.

=== Prison Island (1600–1800s) ===
On 6 April 1605, Sean and his son Humphrey were appointed gaoler of county Leitrim. They constructed a prison on Oileán an Phriosuin, 'Jail Island', in Lough Scur. The cells were small, with holes about six inches in diameter for air. Tradition recalls many people being hanged on the island. Prison Island was abandoned sometime before Carrick on Shannon jail was built circa 1815 and 1824. The prison ruins are barely visible today.

== Heritage (1908 to present) ==
The names of families descended from the Muintir Eolais are common today: Reynolds, Mulvey, McGarry, Shanley and Moran.

Two proven descendants of Eolais are recorded. Today at Clonmacnoise monastery a carved headstone is dedicated to Ódhrán Ua hEolais (d. 994), scribe of Clonmacnois, the inscription reading 'Pray for Odhrán descendant of Eolas'. Another scribe named Flannchad Ua hEolais (fl. 1101) held the Book of Durrow.

Parts of Caisleán Seóin at Lough Scur collapsed circa 1908, but repairs were undertaken by a heritage preservation society. Today, ruins of "Mag Raghnaill" Castles exist at both Lough Scur and Lough Rynn; neither are preserved as heritage sites.

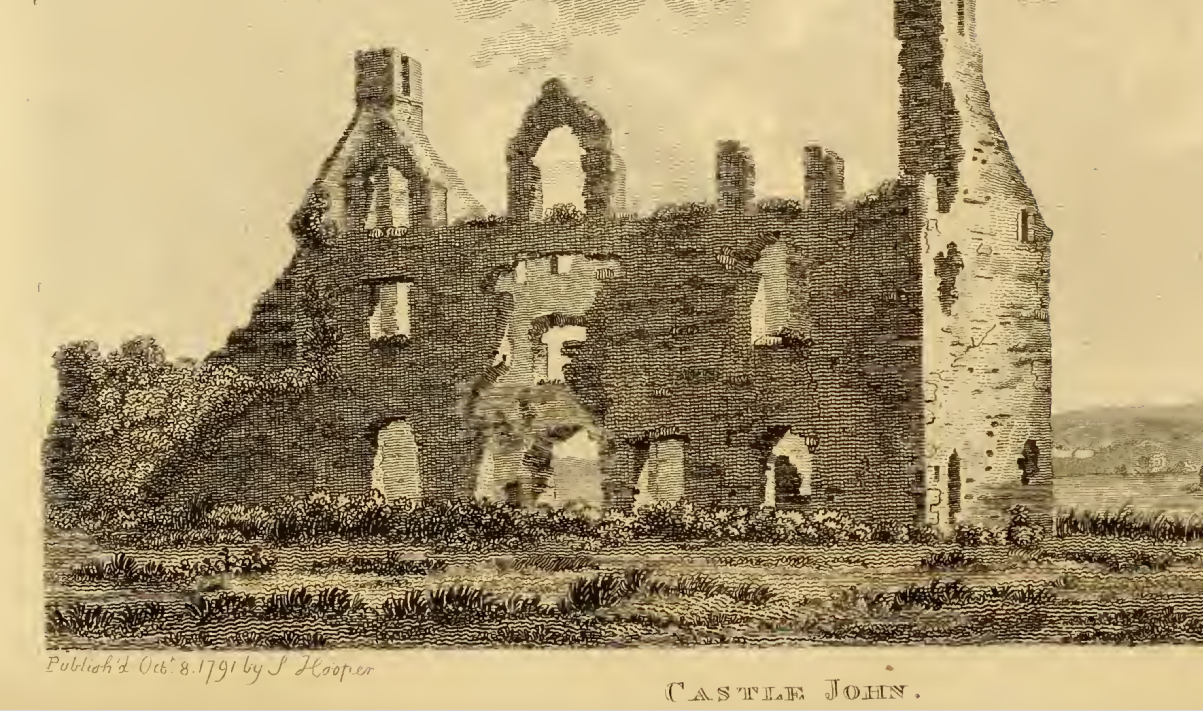
Castle Sean c. 1791

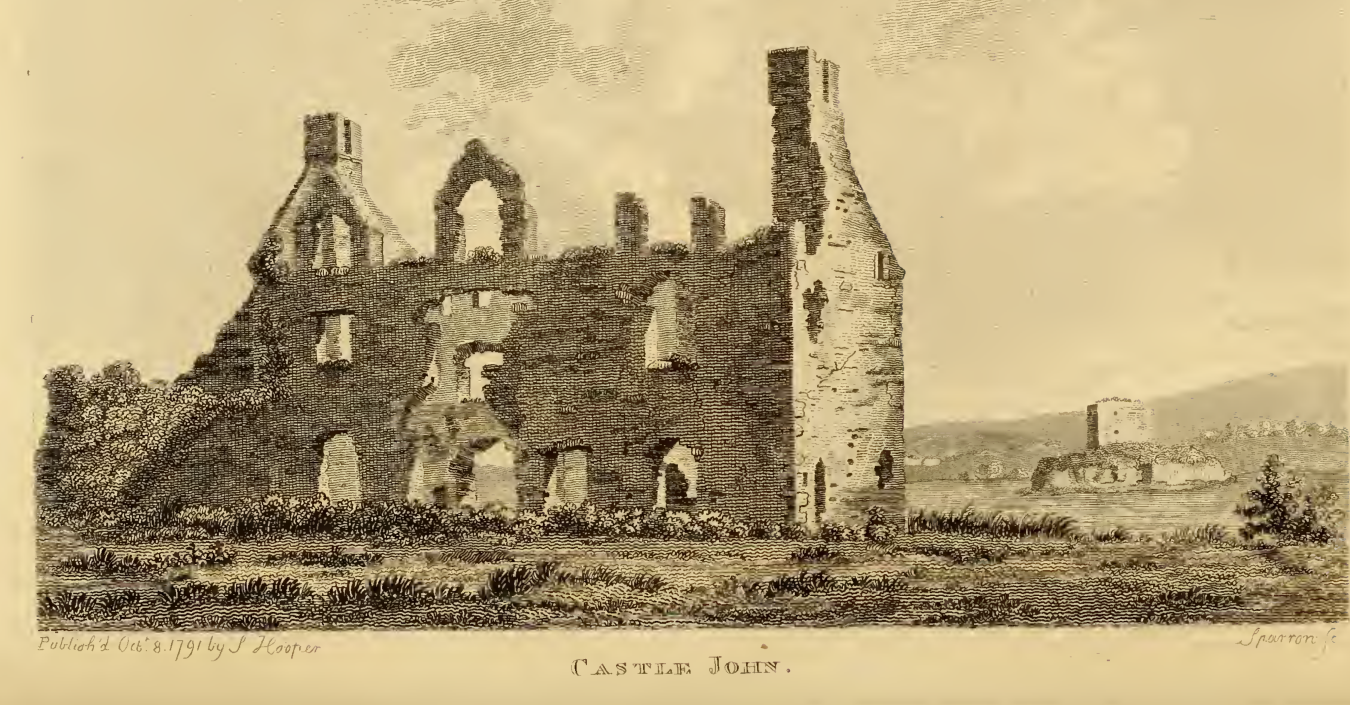
Castle and jail view

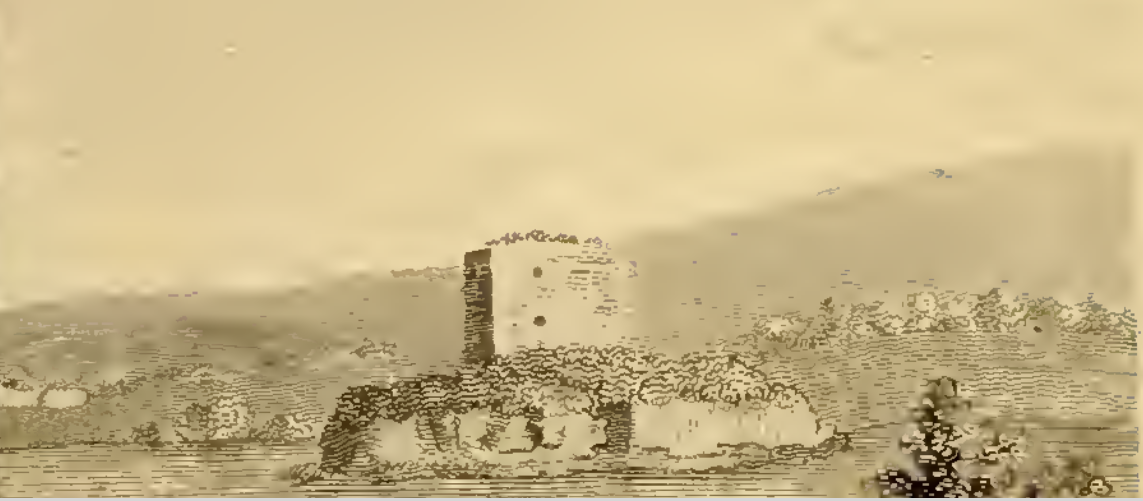
Jail Island c. 1791

After southern Ireland regained independence in 1922, the English county administrative structure was retained. The Muintir Eolais remained largely forgotten. In 1980 Leitrim County Council approved a design of Arms for County Leitrim that included the lion of O'Rourke (north Leitrim, and Carrigallen baronies), but excluded the Muintir Eolais (Mohill, and Leitrim baronies).

The townland of Corryolus (Irish: Coraidh Eolais, "Weir of Eolus"), lying on the junction of the Shannon and Boyle river's, directly north of Carrick on Shannon, obtained its name from "Eolus" from whom the 'Muintir Eolais' are directly descended. In the remote mountainous Cuilcagh-Anierin uplands, the oligotrophic lake named "Lough Munter Eolas" marks a borderline between west Cavan and south Leitrim.

A well established traditional fiddle group, trained by a Fr. Quinn since 1966, adopted the name Ceolus preserving his name, (Note: "A contraction of the Irish words Ceol meaning 'music' and Muintir Eoluis, which means 'the people descended from Eolus', the first Conmhaicne chief of the area of South Leitrim. The band was christened Ceolus on January 31st, 1990."Ward (2016), pp. 12.) and they play music garnered from local manuscripts going back almost two hundred years.

The fictional land of "Clan Eolais" populated by "Eolaisans" and Sylphs, appears in the Solas 2 role playing game.

== See also ==
- West Breifne
- Ódhrán Ua hEolais
- Flannchad Ua hEolais
- Eolais Mac Biobhsach
- Charles Reynolds (cleric)
- Lough Scur

== References and notes ==
=== Primary sources ===
- O'Daly, Aengus; Mangan, James Clarence; O'Donovan, John; O'Daly, Ferdoragh (1852). The Tribes of Ireland: A Satire (PDF). p. 35.

=== Secondary references ===
- An Clochar, Cara Droma Ruisc (1938). "Lough Scur". Duchas.ie (online ed.). Carrick-on-Shannon, Co. Leitrim: National Folklore Collection, University College Dublin. p. 312.
- Ellis, Stephen G. (1976). "The Kildare Rebellion and the early Henrican reformation" (PDF). The Historical Journal. 19 (4): 825. doi:10.1017/S0018246X00010724. hdl:10379/790. S2CID 155083599 – via ARAN (Access to Research at NUI Galway).
- "Eolais". Solas: Luminis Mortuorum – via ObsidianPortal.com.
- Grose, Francis (1795). The Antiquities of Ireland (PDF). Vol. 2. S. Hooper.
- Hardiman, James (1831). "Irish Minstrelsy, or Bardic Remains of Ireland". Robins. p. xlvi (46).
- Hartemink, Ralf (1996). "Leitrim (county) – Coat of arms".
- "Annals of Lough Ce". CELT: Corpus of Electronic Texts. Translated by Hennessy, William M. (online ed.). University College Cork. 2008. LC1137.10.
- Hynes, John (1931). "St. Caillin". The Journal of the Royal Society of Antiquaries of Ireland. 1 (1): 39–54. JSTOR 25513584.
- Joyce, Patrick Weston (1913). Irish names of places (PDF). Vol. 3. Dublin: Phoenix.
- Knox, T. H. (1903). "Occupation of Connaught by the Anglo-Normans after A.D. 1237 (Continued)". The Journal of the Royal Society of Antiquaries of Ireland. 33 (2): 179–189. JSTOR 25507290.
- MacLochlainn, Noel (2018). "Politics of 16th Century South Leitrim: Muintir Eolais Declaration of 1552 AD". Leitrim Guardian.
- MacNamee, James Joseph (1954). History of the Diocese of Ardagh. Dublin: Browne & Nolan.
- Manning, Conleth (2010). "The grave-slab of Charles Reynolds in Rome". The Journal of the Royal Society of Antiquaries of Ireland. 140: 22–27. JSTOR 24395863.
- Meehan, Joseph (1906). "Notes on the Mac Rannals of Leitrim and their Country". Journal of the Royal Society of Antiquaries of Ireland: 144–145.
- Leitrim (PDF). National Monuments in State Care: Ownership & Guardianship (Report). National Monuments Service; Environment, Heritage & Local Government. 4 March 2009.
- Ó Cléirigh, Mícheál (1846). MacDermott, Philip (ed.). The Annals of Ireland, translated from the original Irish of the four masters. Translated by Connellan, Owen (online ed.). Dublin: B. Geraghty.
- O'Donovan, John, ed. (1856). Annála Rioghachta Éireann. Annals of the Kingdom of Ireland by the Four Masters ... with a Translation and Copious Notes. 7 vols. Translated by O'Donovan (2nd ed.). Dublin: Royal Irish Academy. CELT editions. Full scans at Internet Archive: Vol. 1; Vol. 2; Vol. 3; Vol. 4; Vol. 5; Vol. 6; Indices.
- Ó Duígeannáin, Mícheál (1934). "Notes on the History of the Kingdom of Bréifne". The Journal of the Royal Society of Antiquaries of Ireland. 64–65 (1): 113–140. JSTOR 25513764.
- O'Hart, John (1876). "Irish Pedigrees; or, The Origin and Stem of the Irish Nation" (PDF). Dublin: M. H. Gill. pp. 135–136.
- O'Laughlin, Michael C. (2002). The Book of Irish Families, Great & Small. "Families of Ireland" series. Vol. 1 (illustrated, digital ed.). Irish Roots Cafe / Irish Genealogical Foundation. ISBN 0940134098.
- Ó Mael Chonaire, Maílín. Ó Corráin, Donnchadh (ed.). "Agreement between Gerald, 9th earl of Kildare and the Mac Rannalls, A.D. 1530". CELT: Corpus of Electronic Texts (online ed.). University College Cork.
- Petrie, George (1872). Christian Inscriptions in the Irish Language. Vol. 1. Royal Historical & Archaeological Association of Ireland / University Press. p. 61, f131.
- Rowley, Thomas (1937). "Legend of Lough Scurr". Duchas.ie (online ed.). Drumrane, Co. Leitrim: National Folklore Collection, University College Dublin. pp. 268–269.
- Russell, C. W. (1869). "On an agreement in Irish between Gerald, ninth earl of Kildare, and the Mac Rannalls; executed at Maynooth, November 5, 1530, and sealed with the seal of the College of Maynooth". Proceedings of the Royal Irish Academy. 10: 480–489.
- Smith, Horatio (1829). "Translation of an Irish Deed of Gift". The Mirror of Literature, Amusement, and Instruction. 13 (367): 275.
- Templan, Paul (2010). "Irish Hill and Mountain Names" (PDF). MountainViews.ie. p. 14.
- Ward, Conor (2016). Scordatura in the Irish Traditional Fiddle Music of Longford and South Leitrim (PDF). p. 12. Archived from the original (PDF) on 29 October 2016.
- Whelan, Thomas (1938). "Local Ruins". The Schools' Collection: Rosaí (online ed.). Rossy, Co. Leitrim: National Folklore Collection, University College Dublin. pp. 384–5. roll no. 13332, title 3 – via Duchas.ie.
