= Ódhrán ua hEolais =

Mediaeval scribe in Ireland

Odhrán Ua hEolais
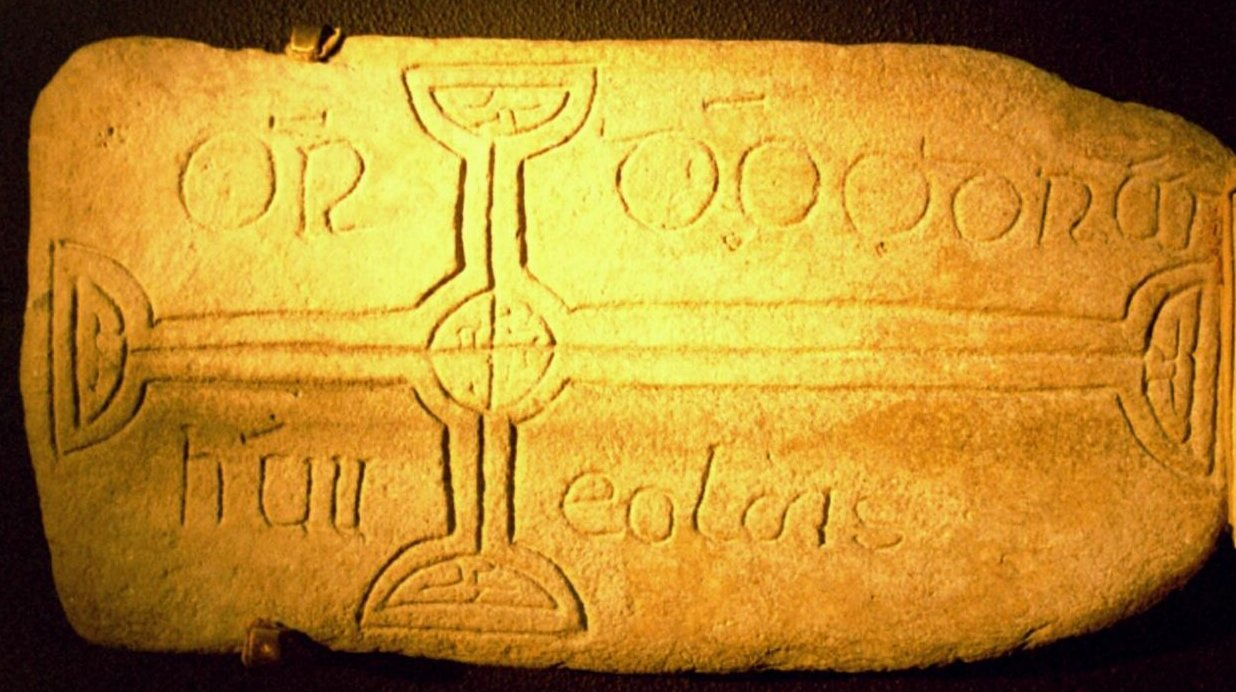
- The cross-stone of Odhran Ua Eolais
- Born: 10th century Muintir Eolais
- Died: 994; Clonmacnoise
- Education: Monasticism, Letters
- Occupation: Scribe
- Relatives: Eolais Mac Biobhsach

Odhran Ua hEolais (died A.D. 994) was a medieval scribe and scholar at the abbey of Clonmacnoise. He must have been born, and lived his childhood, in the kingdom of Conmaicne Magh Réin, which corresponds to present day south county Leitrim. We do not know any significant details of his personal life, but Odhran moved to county Offaly in adult life, to become Lector and a famous scriba of Clonmacnoise. His death is recorded in the Annals of the Four Masters. A cross-stone of Odhran, with his name inscription legible in middle Irish, is preserved to this day.

== Etymology ==
The Irish given name Odhrán ([ˈoːɾˠaːnˠ]), is a diminutive of odhar "dun", and is anglicised Oran. The family name Ó hEóluis has the meaning "descendant of Eolais". O'Donovan claimed the "Eóluis" surname is today anglicised "Olus" or "Olis", though this surname must be very rare.

== Life ==
Odhran was born into the Túath called Conmaicne Réin, present day south county Leitrim, sometime in the first half of the 10th century. His family a Gaelic dynasty who ruled it. Odhran was probably grandson of Eolais Mac Biobhsach (Irish: Ua h-Eolais, "descendant of Eolais"), a king of "Conmaicne Réin". He received some sort of formal education probably at a monastery in county Leitrim. He became proficient and literate in Irish language, Latin, bardic tradition, and religious doctrine.

Sometime in his adult life he moved to Clonmacnoise, the celebrated early Irish Christian monastery, taking the position of ecclesiastical Lector and "scribe of Clonmacnoise". Odhran belonged to the scholarly hierarchy of the church, otherwise called "Irish: gráda ecnai", implying he was not in orders but rather trained in Christian learning. Odhran probably shared duties for scribing manuscripts, and his contributions if preserved over the centuries, would exist in the Irish Annals.

Odhran may have moved to Clonmacnoise to help secure burial rights in Clonmacnoise for Mag Raghnaill of Conmaicne Réin. There was an alleged controversy between Fearghal Ua Ruairc, King of Connaught (died A.D. 964), and Brian mag Raghnaill, a successor of Eolais mac Biobhsach. Mag Raghnaill complained he had no place for a tomb at Clonmacnoise, unlike Fearghal Ua Ruairc, and so bestowed "48 ploughs" of Kiltoghert land to the bishop of Clonmacnoise (Note: The term "48 ploughs" refers the quantity of land which can be ploughed in 48 days.) in exchange for a burial right. It is tempting to suppose the appearance of Odhran Ua hEolais, an outsider, at Clonmacnoise is related to such matters if true, but O'Donovan raises doubts about this O'Rourke connection. (Note: Kehnel notes the alleged "Ua Ruaric tower" was not "finished" until A.D 1124, Ua Ruairc had poor relations with Clonmacnoise, and only later tradition associates this tower with Ua Ruairc. But she agrees "curious tradition has it that one Fergal Ua Ruairc, chief of Breifne, was buried at Clonmacnois .. 10th century". O'Donovan convincingly proved a poem dedicated to "Malachy II", an entry in the Registry of Clonmacnoise, and an entry in the "Annals of Clonmacnoise" were all forged to strengthen the connection of O'Rourke with Clonmacnoise.)

== Death ==
The death of Odhran, c. A.D. 994, is recorded in the Annals of the Four Masters as follows:

- "994: and Odhran Ua h-Eolais, scribe of Cluain-mic-Nois, died", "Irish: & Odhrán ua h-Eolais, scribhnidh Cluana Mic Nóis, decc".

== Cross-slab ==
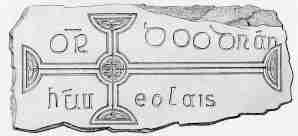
Illustration of cross slab, inscribed: "Pray for Ódhrán, descendant of Eolais"

His cross-slab has been preserved, and four different sources interpreted the inscription as follows:

- OR DOODRAN HAU EOLAIS.
- ÓŔ DÓ ODRÁN HÁU EOLÁIS.
- O~R~ || D~O~ODRÁN | HÁU || EOLAIS, expanded as OROIT DO ODRÁN HÁU EOLAIS.
- O~R~ || DOODRÁN | HÁU || EOLAIS, expanded as OROIT DO ODRÁN HÁU EOLAIS, and translated to "Pray for Odrán, descendant of Eolais".
- ÕÕ DO ODRAN HAUEOLAIS.

Instead of the more usual key-pattern, interlace and channels were used to ornament the central and boundary areas of the distorted cross motif on Ordan's stone, a decorative practice which dropped out of use on Clonmacnoise cross-slabs, c. AD 1000. MacAlister states the cross on the "Ódhrán stone" is a poor piece of work, and may be regarded as an imitation of the design on the handsome stone of "Mael-Finnia", the Abbot of Clonmacnoise who died A.D. 991, as both stones share similar ornamental features. Graves thought it was a "fine specimen, both as to cross and inscription".

These may be "grave stones", but the awkward way in which the inscription was fitted onto the stone introduces the notion these slabs were kept in stock in the monastery workshop with pre-inscribed crosses, until a client name needed to be fitted in. This implies Ódhrán might have commissioned the stone to request prayers for himself, and the slab was not his grave memorial.

== See also ==
- Flannchad Ua hEolais
- Eolais Mac Biobhsach

== Notes and references ==
=== Primary sources ===
- Petrie, George (1872). Christian Inscriptions in the Irish Language. Vol. 1. Royal historical and archaeological association of Ireland, University Press. p. 61, f131.
- O'Donovan, John, ed. (1856). Annála Rioghachta Éireann. Annals of the Kingdom of Ireland by the Four Masters ... with a Translation and Copious Notes. 7 vols. Translated by O'Donovan (2nd ed.). Dublin: Royal Irish Academy. CELT editions. Full scans at Internet Archive: Vol. 1; Vol. 2; Vol. 3; Vol. 4; Vol. 5; Vol. 6; Indices.

=== Secondary sources ===
- Macalister, Robert Alexander Stewart (1909). The memorial slabs of Clonmacnois, King's County : with an appendix on the materials for a history of the monastery (PDF). Dublin : University Press. p. 97.
- Woulfe, Patrick (1923). "Ó hEÓLUIS".
- Davies, Graham-Campbell, ed. (1999). "Celtic Inscribed Stones" (CLMAC/108/1 ed.). University College London.
- O'Donovan, John (1857). "The Registry of Clonmacnoise; With Notes and Introductory Remarks" (PDF). The Journal of the Kilkenny and South-East of Ireland Archaeological Society. 1: 444–460.
- Lionard, Pádraig; Henry, Françoise (1960–1961). "Early Irish Grave-Slabs". Proceedings of the Royal Irish Academy. Section C: Archaeology, Celtic Studies, History, Linguistics, Literature. Proceedings of the Royal Irish Academy, Section C Vol. 61. Royal Irish Academy: 95–169. JSTOR 25505096. (subscription required)
- "SMR No. OF005-023361" (Archaeological Survey of Ireland ed.). National Monuments Service. 2011.
- Harbison, Peter (1995). Pilgrimage in Ireland: The Monuments and the People. Syracuse University Press. p. 202. ISBN 9780815603122.
- Kehnel, Annette (1997). Clonmacnois - the Church and Lands of St. Ciar'an: Change and Continuity in an Irish Monastic Foundation (6th to 16th Century). LIT Verlag Münster. p. 232. ISBN 9783825834425.
- Otway, Caesar (1839). A tour in Connaught, by the author of 'Sketches in Ireland' [signing himself C.O.]. Oxford University. p. 429.
- O'Clery, Michael; O'Clery, Cucogry; O'Mulconry, Ferfeasa; O'Duigenan, Cucogry; O'Clery, Conary (1856). John O'Donovan (ed.). Annala Rioghachta Eireann : Annals of the kingdom of Ireland (PDF). Vol. 1. Dublin : Hodges, Smith.
- Swift, Catherine (2003). King, H.A. (ed.). Sculptors and their Customers: A study of Clonmacnoise Grave-slabs. Vol. Clonmacnoise Studies Volume 2 (Seminar Papers 1998 ed.). Belfast: The Stationery Office. pp. 105–123. ISBN 9780755717934.
- Duffy, Seán, ed. (2005). Medieval Ireland: An Encyclopedia. Vol. Routledge Encyclopedias of the Middle Ages. Routledge. ISBN 1135948240.
- O'Donovan, John (1858). "Elegy of Erard Mac Coise, Chief chronicler of the Gaels, pronounced over the tomb of Fergal O'Ruaric, Chief of Brefny, at Clonmacnoise". The Journal of the Kilkenny and South-east of Ireland Archaeological Society. 4 (Digitized 2014 from original at the University of California ed.). The Society: 341–356.
- Graves, James (1856). A list of the Ancient Irish Monumental stones at present existing at Clonmacnoise. Royal Society of Antiquaries of Ireland.

=== Bibliography ===
- Macalister, Robert Alexander Stewart (1949). Corpus inscriptionum insularum celticarum. Vol. 2 (half-uncial inscriptions ed.). Dublin : Stationery Office, Irish Manuscripts Commission. p. 54.
