= Flannchad Ua hEolais =

12th century scribe in Ireland

- Born: 11th century Muintir Eolais
- Died: aft. 1101; Probably County Offaly
- Education: Monasticism, Letters
- Occupation: Scribe
- Relatives: Muintir Eolais and Ódhrán ua hEolais

Flannchad Ua hEolais (fl. 1101) was a twelfth century scribe and scholar at Durrow Abbey of Durrow, County Offaly, Ireland. He was likely born, and lived his childhood, at Conmaicne Réin, present day southern County Leitrim. Flannchad moved to County Offaly in adult life to become a scriba (scribe) at Durrow Abbey.

== Life ==
Flannchad was a scholar and scribe at Durrow, County Offaly. He wrote a document on a blank verso of the Book of Durrow. The text, in Irish and Latin, describes a resolution for some unrecorded dispute, supposedly agreed during the reign of Muirchertach Ua Briain as high king of Ireland. That suggests Flannchad was active circa 1101AD. Flannchad was probably buried at Durrow monastery.

A great agreement (oentu) between Comgan and Columcille. ... It was given in the time of Muiredach mac meic Cormain and Muircheartach Ua Briain king of Ireland... Flannchad Ua hEolais was the scribe. (App. XXVII)

He possessed the rare 11-12th century "Ua hEolais" surname. A second scribe name, Ódhrán ua hEolais (d. 994 AD), recorded at Clonmacnoise must be a relative. The family name originates from Muintir Eolais of county Leitrim.
