= Book of Durrow =

Medieval illuminated manuscript gospel book

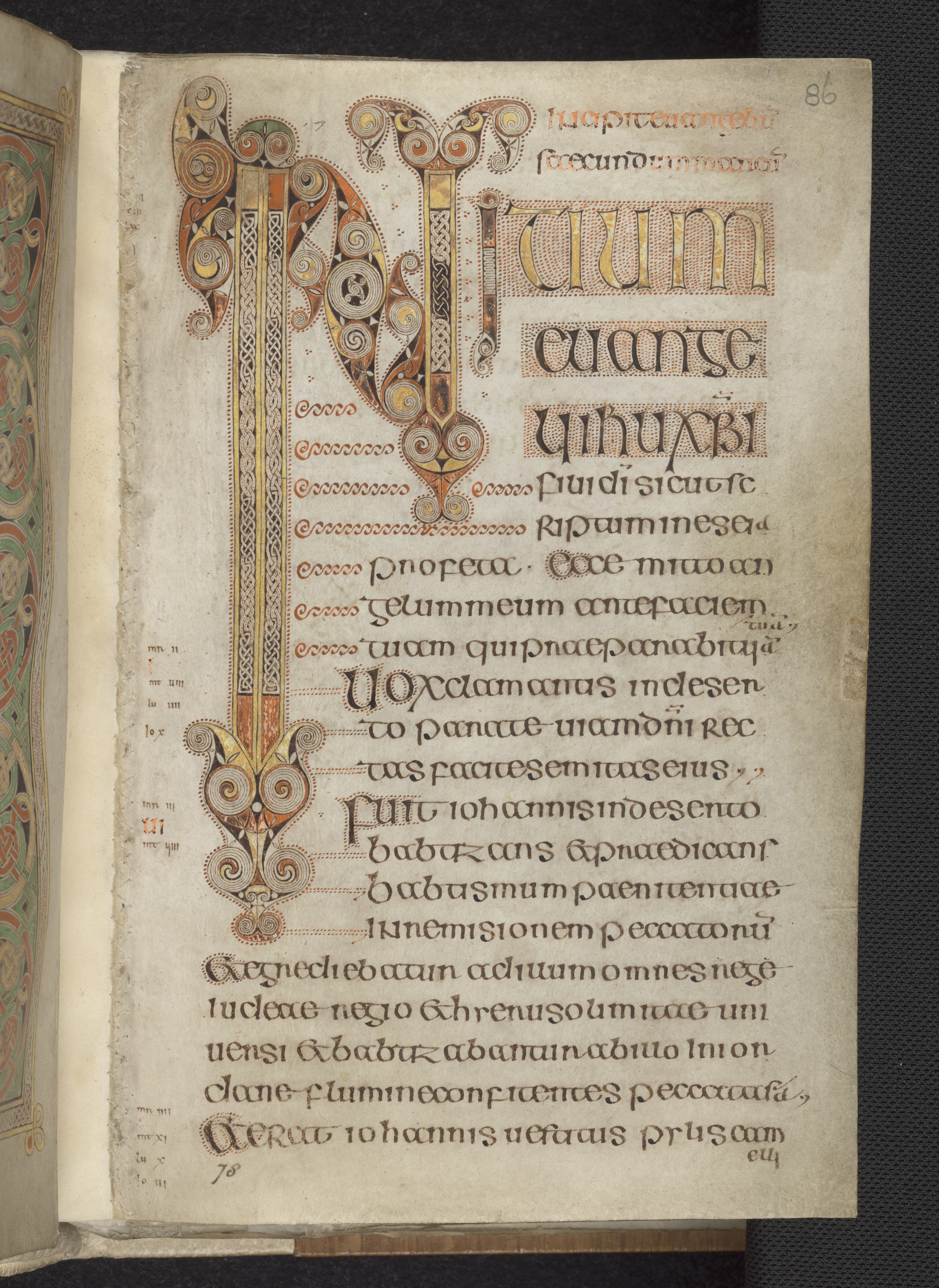
The beginning of the Gospel of Mark from the Book of Durrow

The Book of Durrow is an illuminated manuscript gospel book dated to c. 700 that contains the Vulgate Latin text of the four Gospels, with some Irish variations, and other matter, written in Insular script, and richly illustrated in the style of Insular art with four full-page Evangelist symbols, six carpet pages, and many decorated initials.

Its origin and dating has been subject to much debate. The book was probably made in Ireland, in or near Durrow Abbey, County Offaly, founded by Colum Cille (or Columba) in the 6th century, rather than the sometimes proposed origin of Northumbria, a region that had close political and artistic ties with Ireland, and like Scotland, also venerated Colum Cille. There is no record of it ever having been outside of Ireland.

Historical records indicate that the book was probably at Durrow Abbey by 916, making it one of the earliest extant Insular manuscripts. The abbey did not survive the Norman invasion of Ireland. The book is badly damaged, and has been repaired and rebound many times over the centuries. Today it is in the Library of Trinity College Dublin (TCD MS 57).

== Description ==
It is the oldest surviving complete illuminated Insular gospel book, for example predating the Book of Kells by over a century. The text includes the gospels of Matthew, Mark, Luke and John, plus several pieces of prefatory matter (the Letter of Jerome, prefaces, summaries, glossary of proper names and canon tables). Its pages measure 245 by 145 mm and there are 248 vellum folios. It contains a large illumination programme including six extant carpet pages, a full page miniature of the four evangelists' symbols, four full page miniatures, each containing a single evangelist symbol, and six pages with significant decorated initials and text. It is written in majuscule insular script (in effect the block capitals of the day), with some lacunae.

The page size has been reduced by subsequent rebindings, and most leaves are now single when unbound, where many or most would originally have been in "bifolia" or folded pairs. It is clear that some pages have been inserted in the wrong places. The main significance of this is that it is unclear if there was originally a seventh carpet page. Now Matthew does not have one, but there is, most unusually, one as the last page in the book. Perhaps there were only ever six: one at the start of the book with a cross, one opposite the next page with the four symbols (as now), and one opposite each individual symbol at the start of each gospel. Otherwise the original programme of illumination seems to be complete, which is rare in manuscripts of this age.

In the standard account of the development of the Insular gospel book, the Book of Durrow follows the fragmentary Northumbrian Gospel Book Fragment (Durham Cathedral Library, A. II. 10.) and precedes the Book of Lindisfarne, which was begun around 700.

== Illumination ==
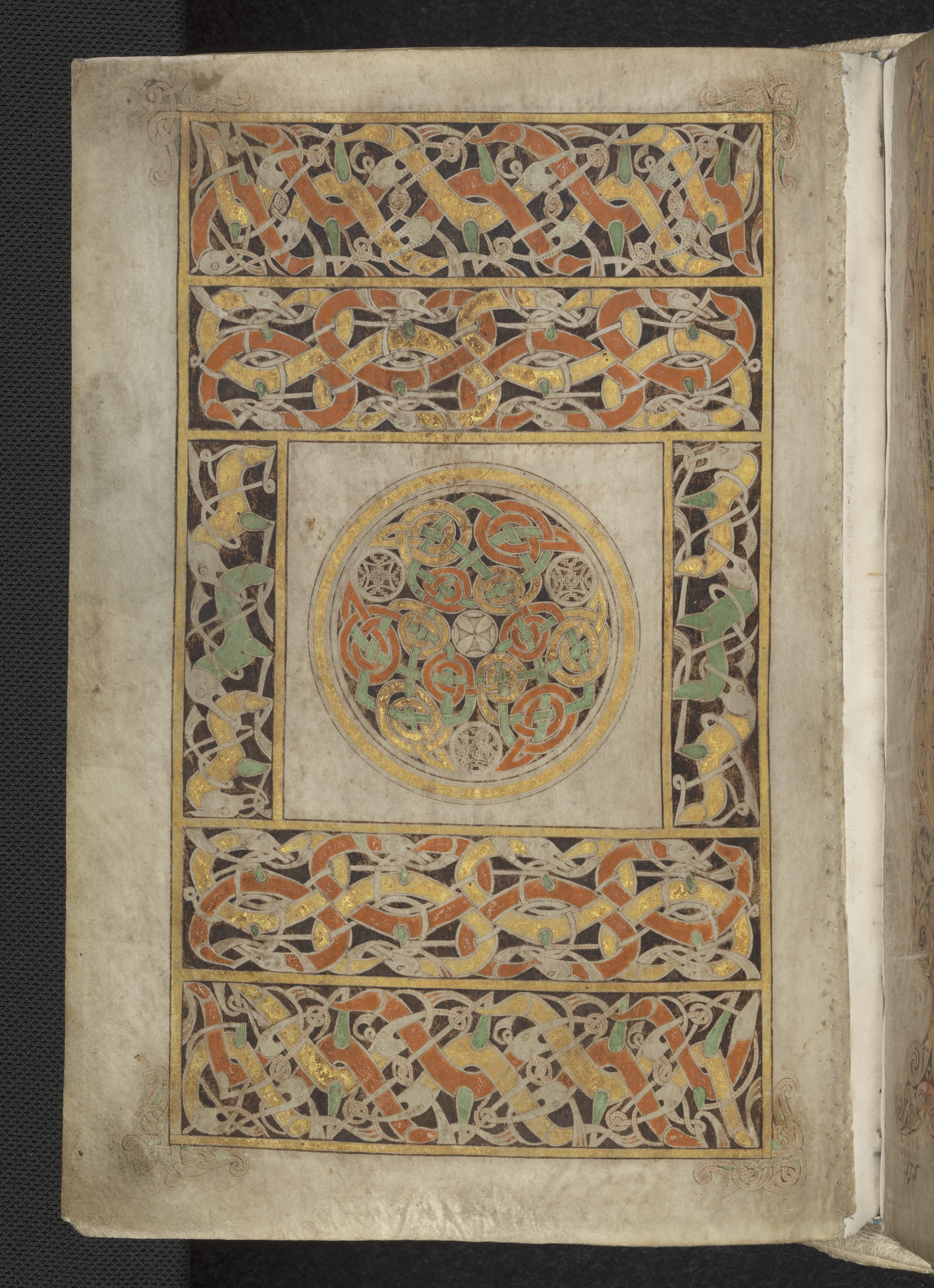
Carpet page with interlaced animals

The illumination of the book shows especially well the varied origins of the Insular style, and has been a focus for the intense art-historical discussion of the issue. One thing that is clear is that the artist was unused to representing the human figure; his main attempt, the Man symbol for Matthew, has been described as a "walking buckle". Apart from Anglo-Saxon metalwork, and Coptic and Syriac manuscript illustrations, the figure has been compared to a bronze figure with a panel of geometric enamel on his trunk, from a bucket found in Norway. Christopher de Hamel writes that, "Like the Book of Kells, [the Book of Durrow] carries the legend that it was copied by Saint Columba... It too has a set of Canon tables, six elaborate carpet pages, five full-page images of the symbols of the Evangelists (one on folio 2r showing all four, the others at the start of each Gospel), five very large initials up to full page in size, and very numerous smaller initials. The Book of Durrow is not as elaborate as the Book of Kells or as large, but it shows all those incipient features of swirling Celtic interlace and infill."

The animal iconography derives from Germanic zoomorphic designs. The geometric borders and the carpet pages cause more disagreement. The interlace, like that of the Durham fragment, is mostly large compared to the Book of Lindisfarne, but the extreme level of detail found in later Insular books begins here in the Celtic spirals and other curvilinear decoration used in initials and in sections of carpet pages. The page illustrated at left has animal interlace around the sides that is drawn from Germanic Migration Period Animal Style II, as found for example in the Anglo-Saxon jewellery at Sutton Hoo, and on the Benty Grange hanging bowl. But the circular panel in the centre seems, although not as precisely as other parts of the book, to draw on Celtic sources, although the three white circles at the edge recall Germanic metalwork studs in enamel or other techniques.

The Book of Durrow is unusual in that it does not use the traditional scheme, usual since Saint Jerome, for assigning the symbols to the Evangelists. Each Gospel begins with an Evangelist's symbol – a man for Matthew, an eagle for Mark (not the lion traditionally used), a calf for Luke and a lion for John (not the eagle traditionally used). This is also known as the pre-Vulgate arrangement. Each evangelist symbol, except the Man of Matthew is followed by a carpet page, followed by the initial page. This missing carpet page is assumed to have existed. A first possibility is that it was lost, and a second that it is in fact folio 3, which features swirling abstract decoration. Where the four symbols appear together on folio 2r they appear in the normal order if read clockwise, and in the pre-Vulgate order if read anti-clockwise, which may be deliberate.

The first letter of the text is enlarged and decorated, with the following letters surrounded by dots. Parallels with metalwork can be noted in the rectangular body of St Matthew, which looks like a millefiori decoration, and in details of the carpet pages.

There is a sense of space in the design of all the pages of the Book of Durrow. Open vellum balances intensely decorated areas. Animal interlace of very high quality appears on folio 192v. Other motifs include spirals, triskeles, ribbon plaits and circular knots in the carpet pages and borders around the Four Evangelists.

== Evangelists' symbols ==
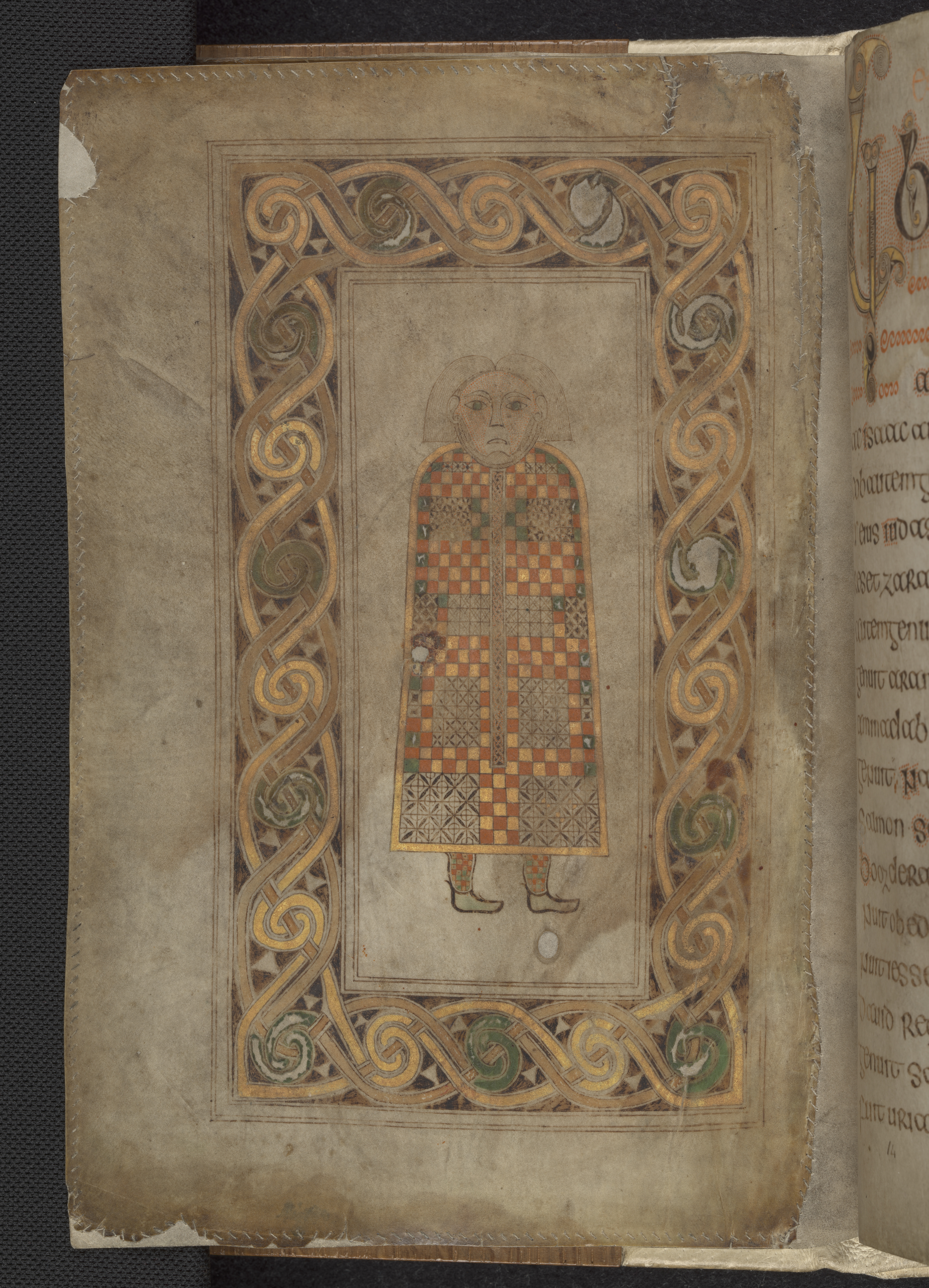
The Man of Matthew (folio 21v)

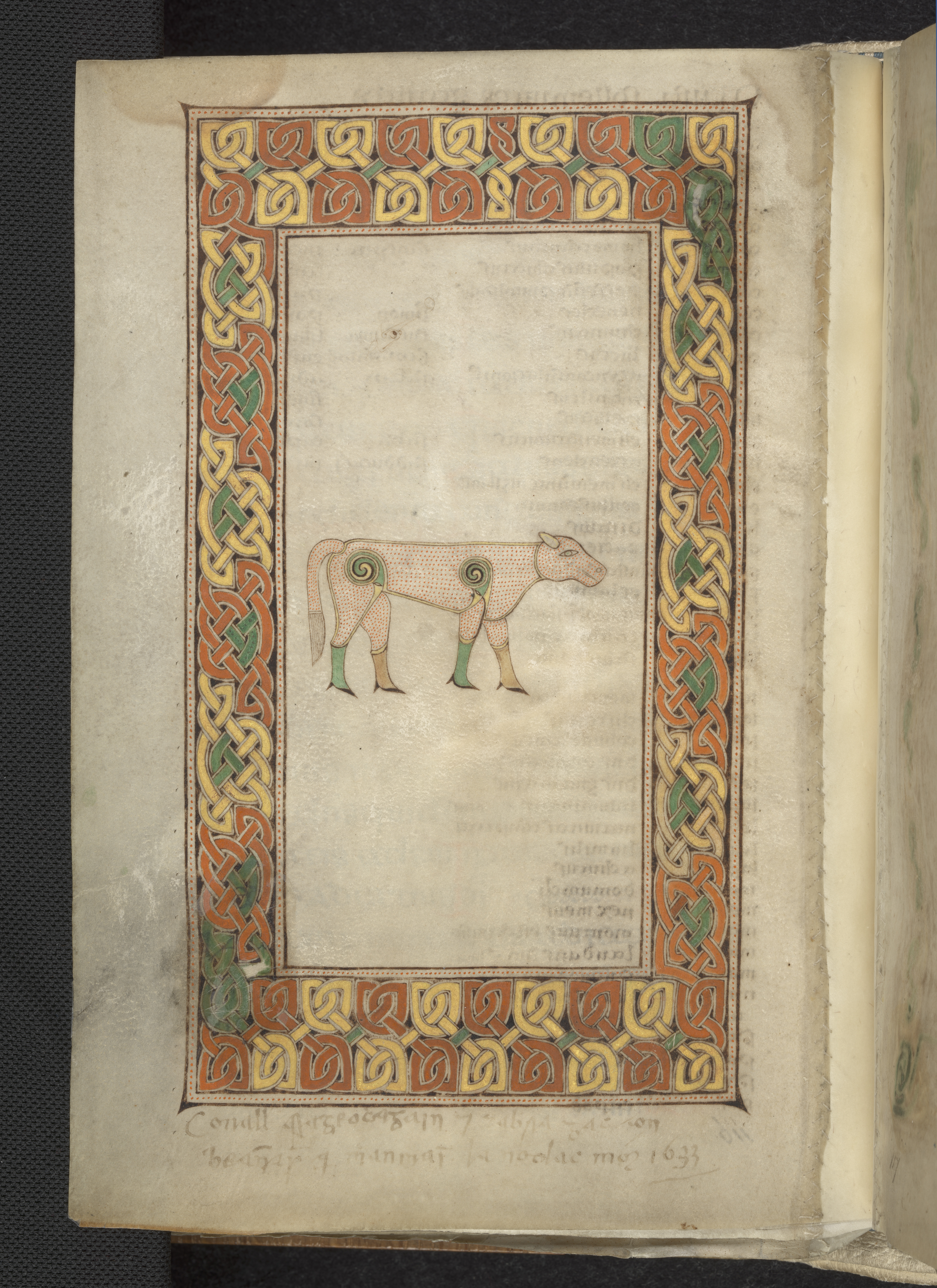
The Ox of Luke (folio 124v)

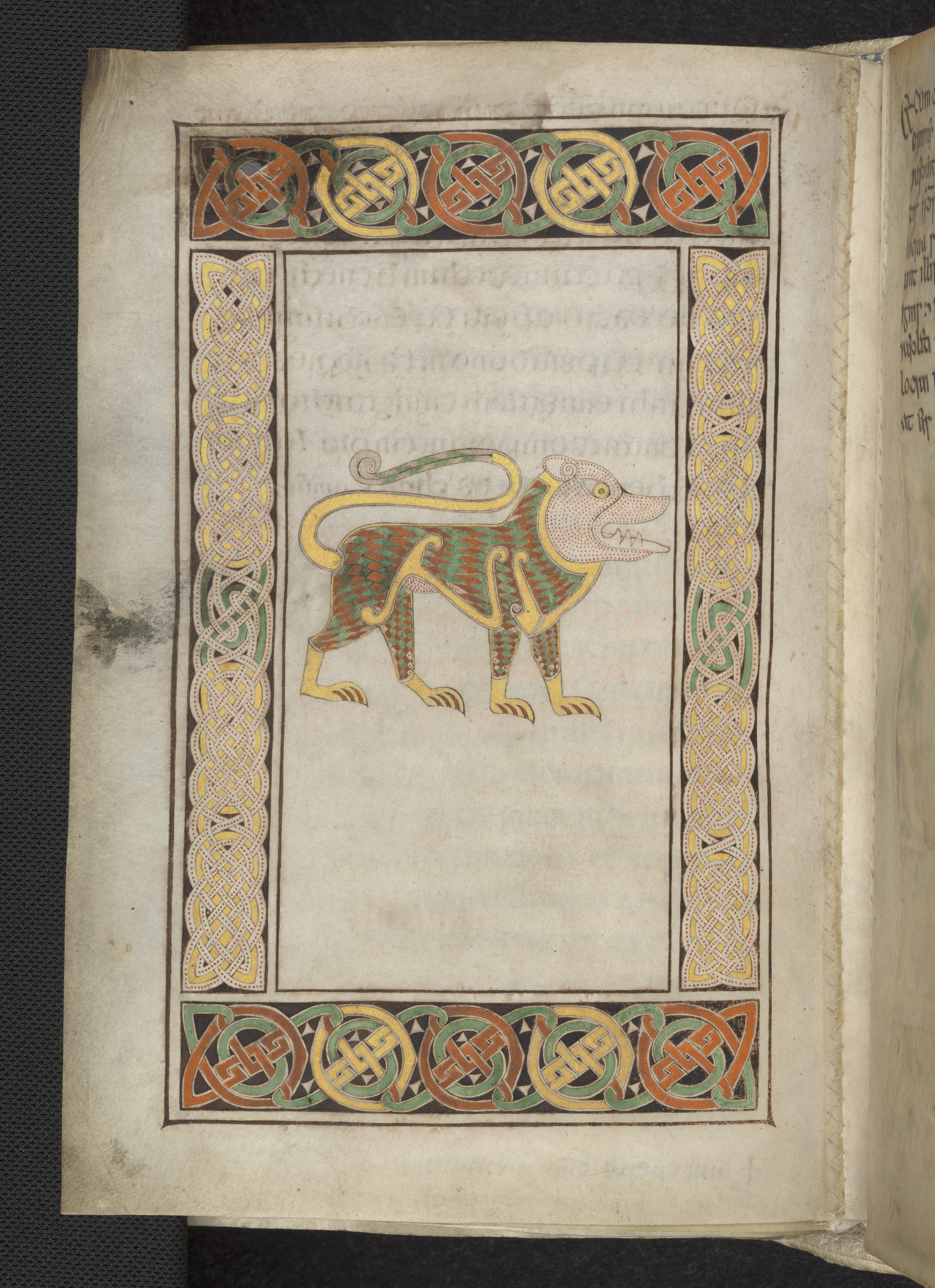
The Lion, here of Mark (folio 191v)

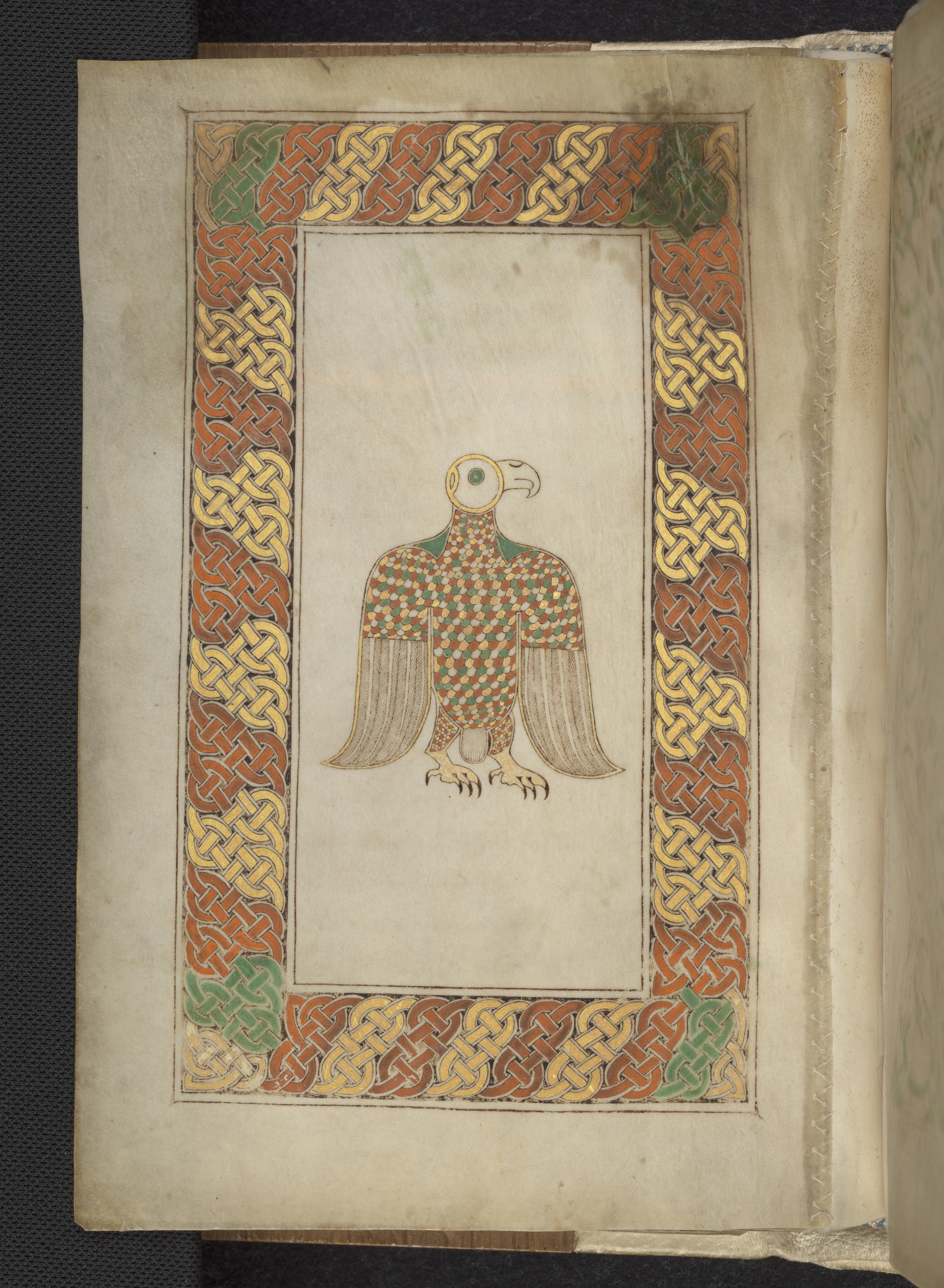
The eagle, here of John (folio 84v)

== History ==
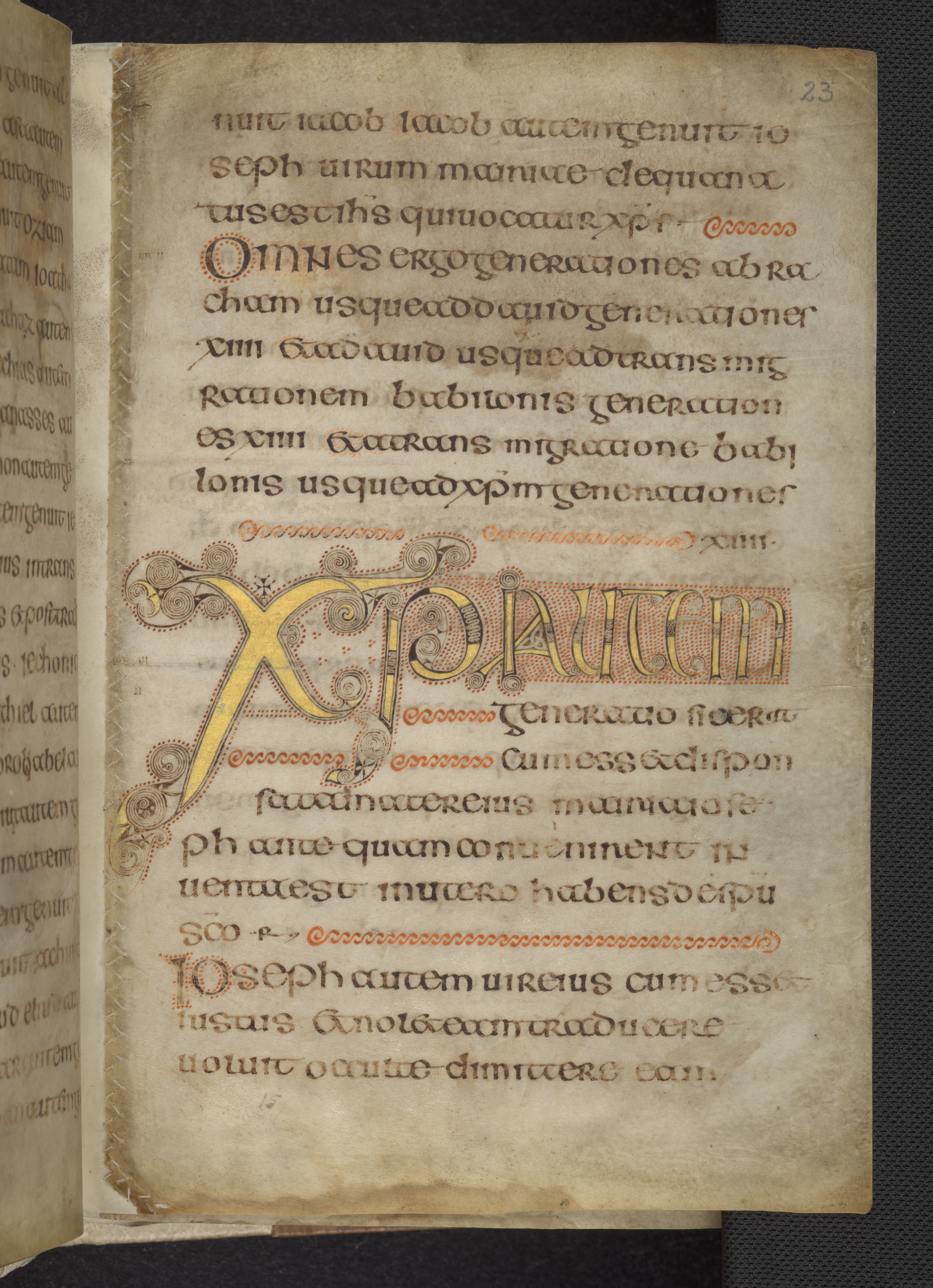
Page with Chi-Rho Matthew 1:18

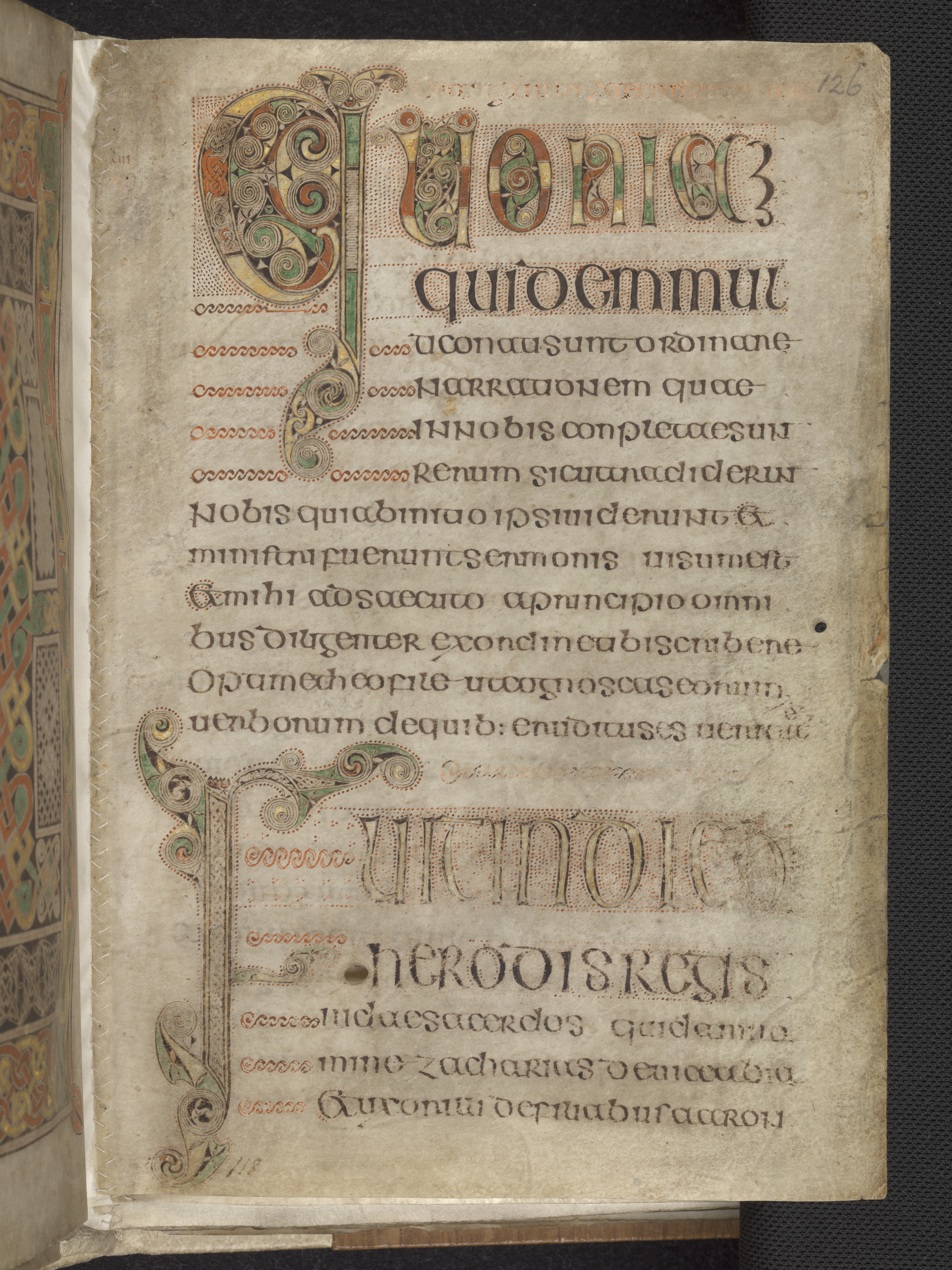
Folio 126r

The book is named after a monastery in Durrow, County Offaly, founded by Colum Cille late in his life, while he was abbot of Iona. Although Colum Cille founded monasteries in Ireland, Scotland and the early medieval Anglo-Saxon kingdom Northumbria in today's Northern England, the rough recent consensus amongst scholars is that the book was produced at Durrow, or at least in Ireland, around 700, although the range of proposed dates around that year is fairly large, and largely dependent on the dating given to other related manuscripts.

The colophon of the book (f. 247r) contains an erased and overwritten note which, according to one interpretation, is by "Colum" who scribed the book, which he said he did in twelve days. This probably relates to the belief that Colum Cille (Saint Columba) had created the book, but its date and authenticity is unclear. Twelve days is a plausible time to scribe one gospel, but not four, still less with all the decoration.

What is known for certain is that Flann Sinna (877-916), High King of Ireland, commissioned a silver cumdach, a "book-shrine" or metalwork reliquary for the book. The shrine is the earliest known cumdach, and was recorded by the antiquary Roderick O'Flaherty in 1677, after the MS reached Trinity College, but then disappeared in the disturbances of 1689, when Trinity College was taken over by the military. By 1699 it had only "a plain brown rough leathern cover". In the description of 1677, which is now bound into the manuscript as Folio IIv, the cover had a silver cross, an arm of which was inscribed in Irish with the name of the craftsman (not recorded by O'Flaherty) and on the main shaft an inscription "invoking the blessing of St Colum Cille on King Flann, who caused the shrine to be made". Typically, cumdachs were not easily openable, and once in the shrine it was probably rarely if ever removed for use as a book.

The manuscript was still at Durrow Abbey at some point around 1100, as a note on folio 248v by the Durrow scribe Flannchad Ua hEolais, records the transfer to Durrow Abbey of land by another monastery. The monastery seems physically to have been destroyed after the Norman Invasion of Ireland, its lands passing to Hugh de Lacy, Lord of Meath, who used the stones in his new castle at the site. But the monastery may have maintained some sort of existence until the Protestant Reformation, when all monasteries were dissolved in 1547.

Like other books thought to have been owned or scribed by saints, it was regarded as a relic, in this case of Colum Cille. It was recorded that by 1627 the un-named custodian of the book ("the Ignorant man that had same in his Custody") used it to cure disease in cattle by immersion in water, which was then given to the cows. The present folios 208 to 221 show particular damage from immersion, and have a hole in the top right corner. Probably this section was detached from the rest, tied with a string through the hole, and used for this purpose.

At the latest by 1547, when Durrow Abbey was dissolved, the book went into private ownership; whose is unknown. It was borrowed and studied by James Ussher, probably when he was Bishop of Meath from 1621 to 1623. In the period 1661 to 1682 it was given to the library at Trinity College, together with the Book of Kells, by Henry Jones while he was Bishop of Meath.

== Carpet pages ==
The Book of Durrow contains six carpet pages.

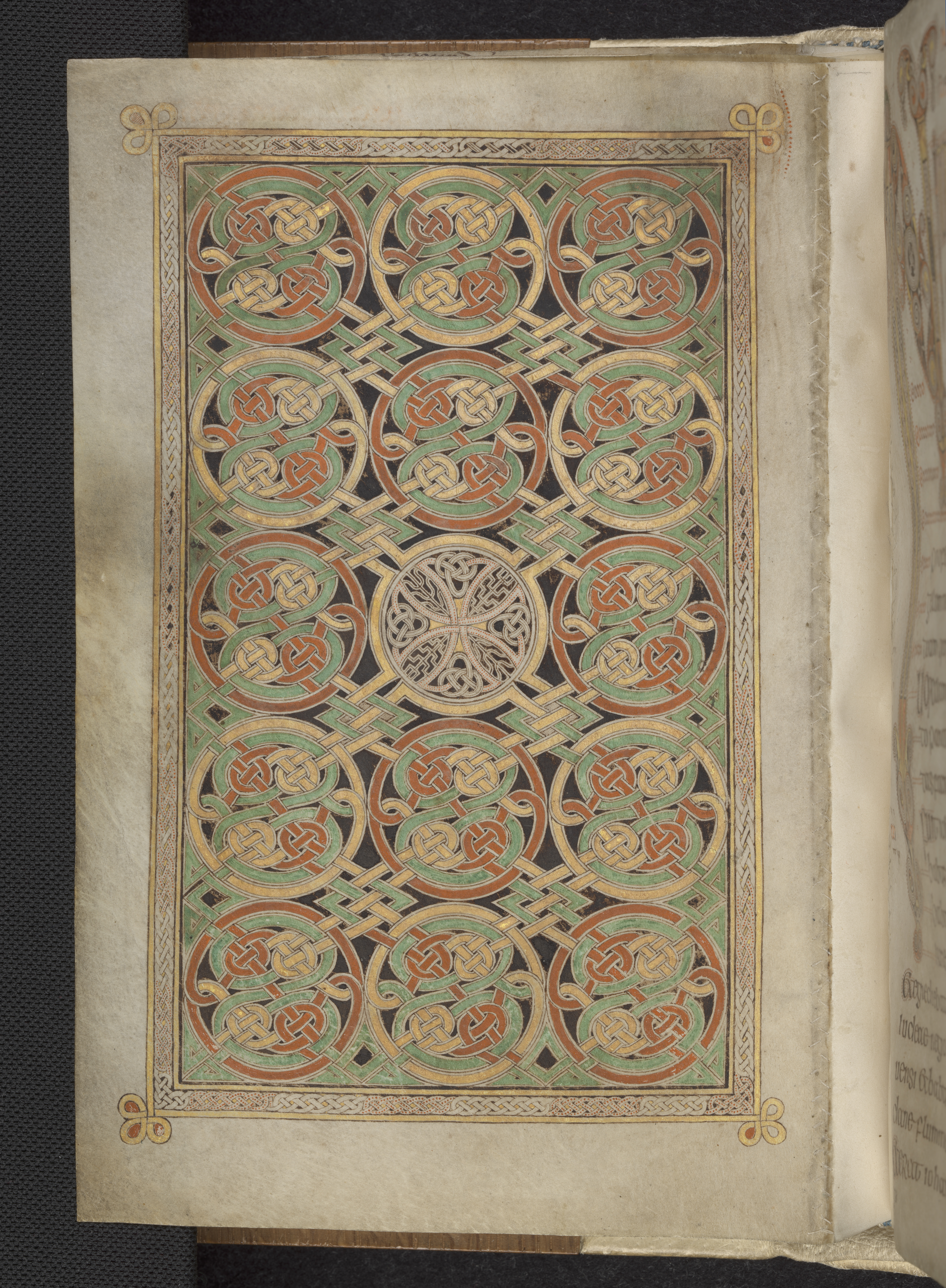
Folio 85v

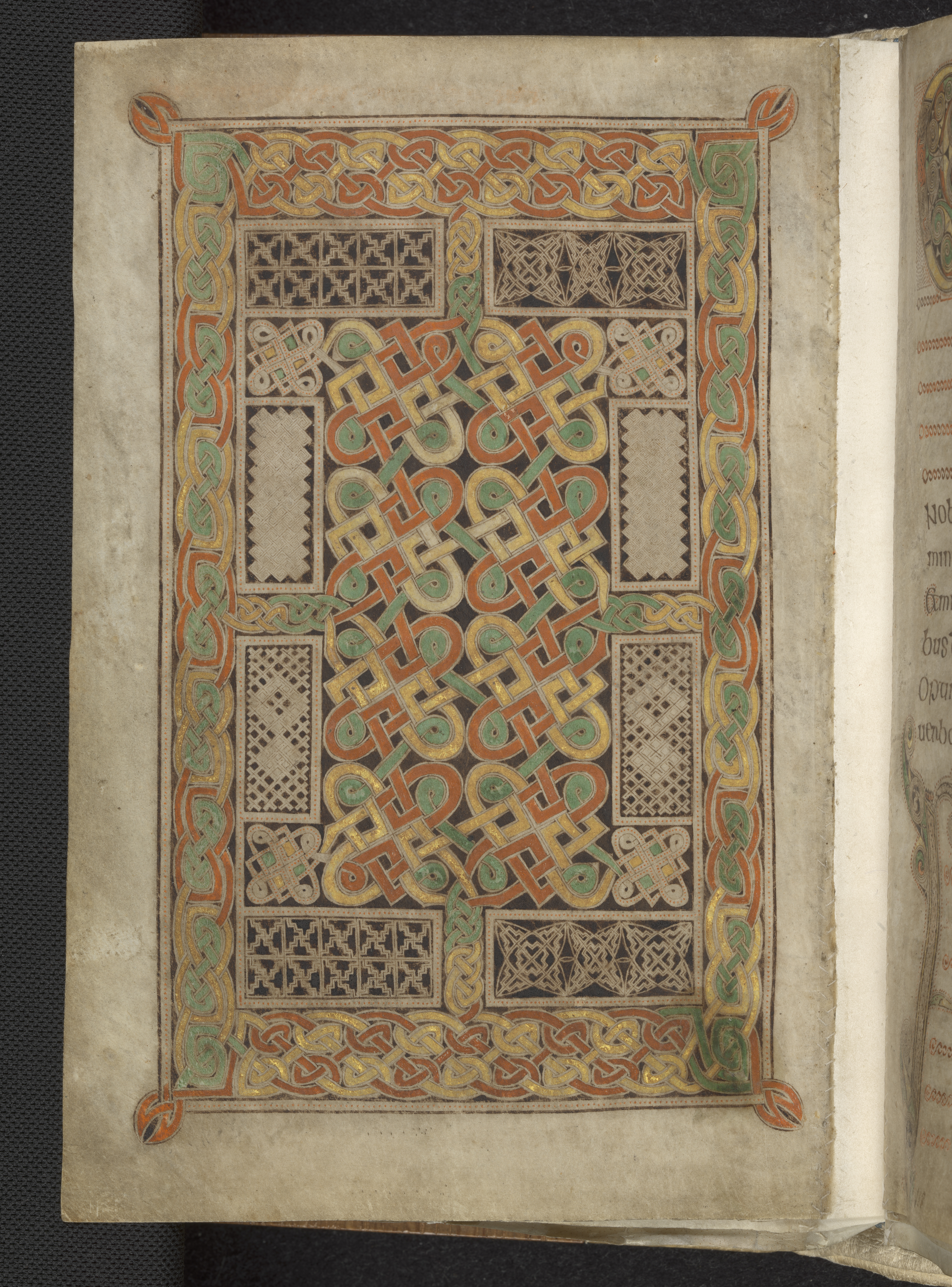
Folio 125v

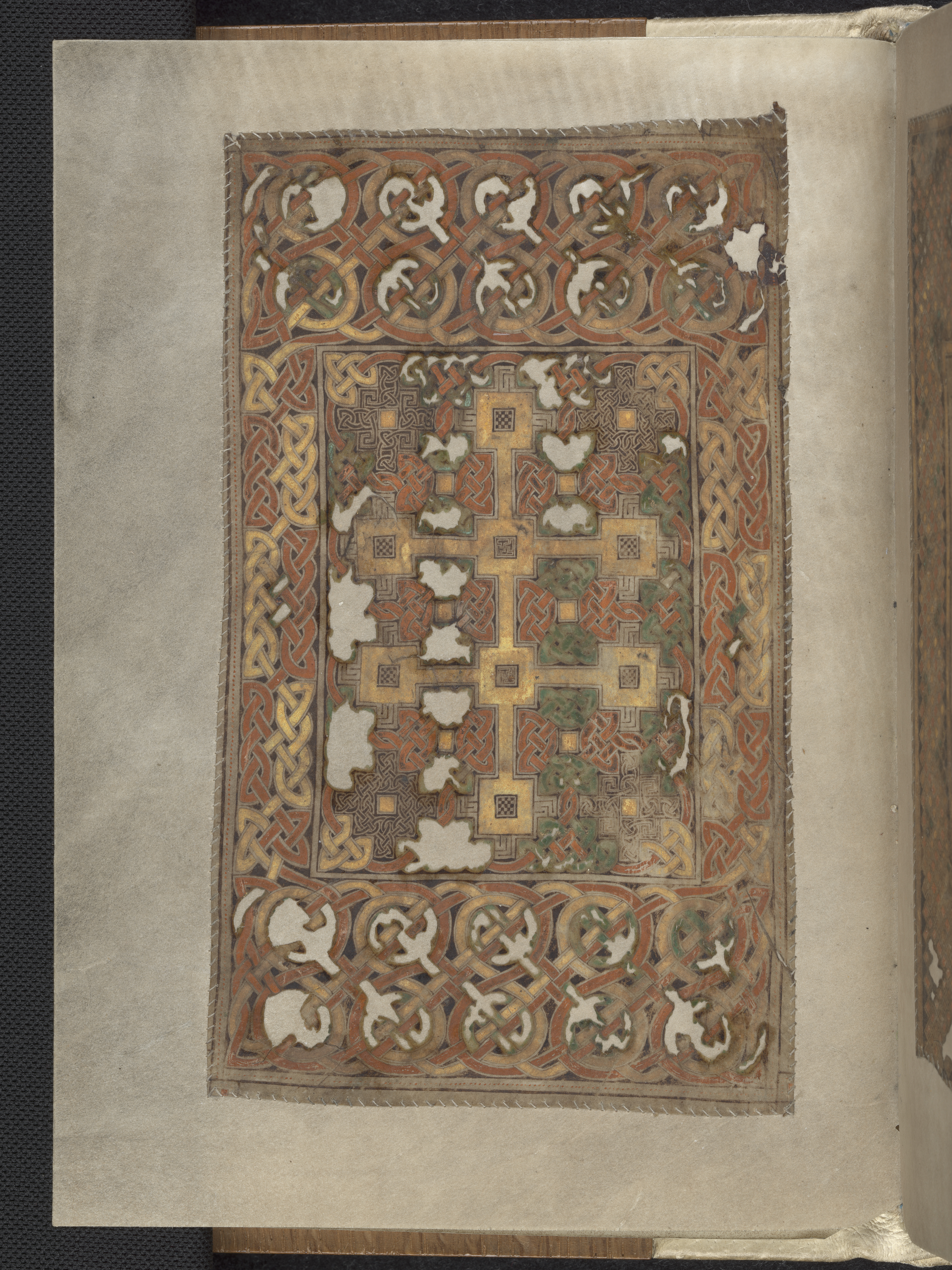
Book of Durrow f.1v

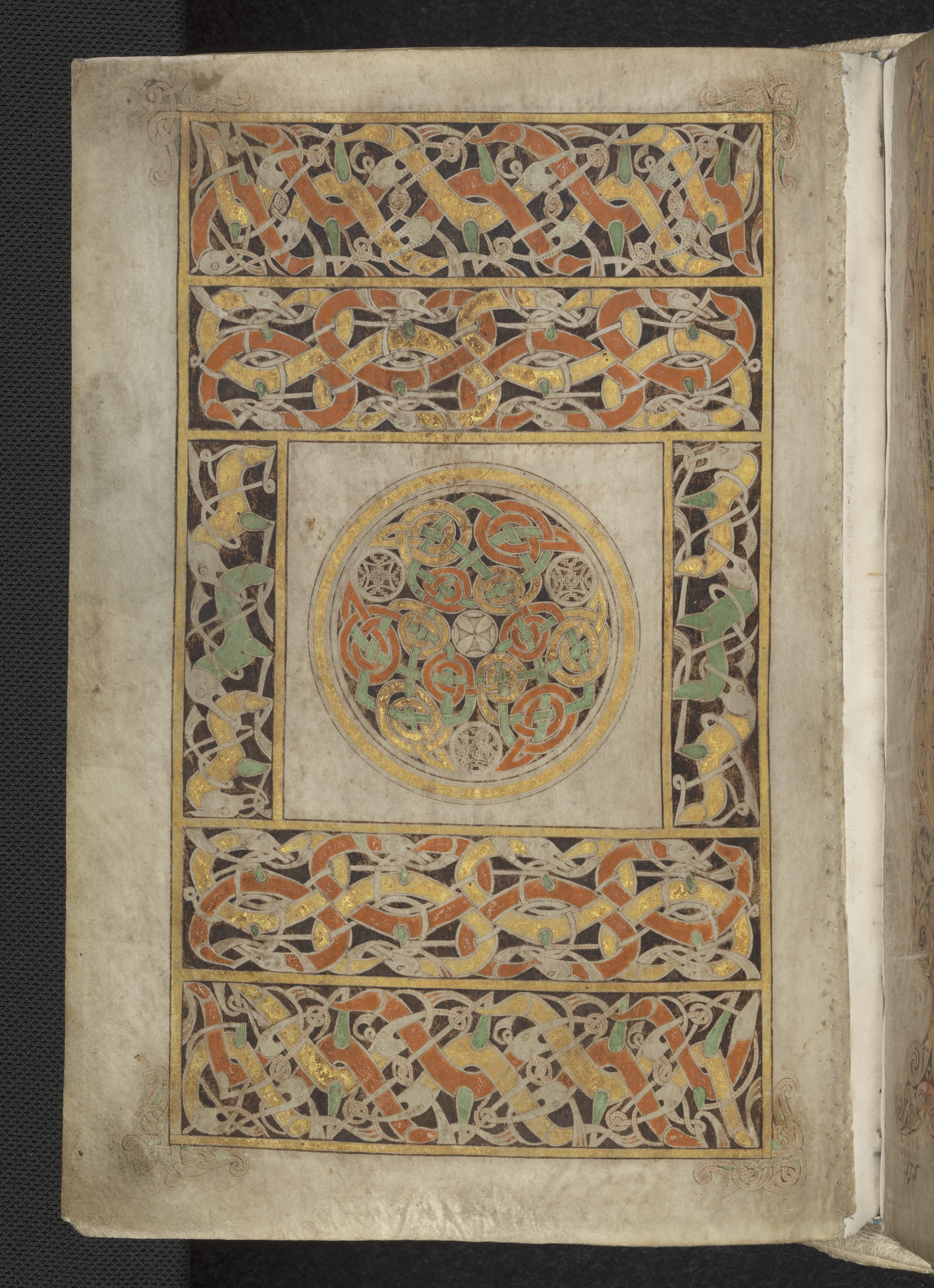
Folio 192v
