= Cusack =

Family name

- Languages: Irish, English

Origin
- Language: Norman French
- Origin: Cussacq
- Region of origin: Cussack, Aquitaine

Other names
- Variant forms: Cusack; Kuzak; Kuzack; Cusick; Cussack

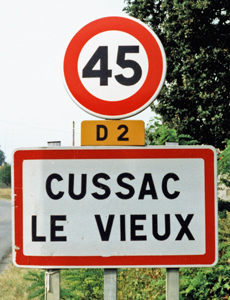

Cusack is an Irish family name of Norman origin Cussacq, which is originally from Cussac in Guienne (Aquitaine), France. The surname has diminished in common use in England, but is still common in Ireland, where it was introduced during the Norman invasion of Ireland in the 12th century.

While Cusack is not a particularly common name, it is often historically associated with a number of variant forms, such as de Cussac, de Cusack, de Ciusak, de Cíosóg, de Cíomhsíg, Mac Íosóg, and Mac Isog.

Cusack, Kuzak, Kuzack, Cusick, and Cussack are all modern-day variants of this name.

== Origin ==
The origin of this last name began when Godefridus de Cussacq, (eventually recorded as Geoffrey de Cusack) arrived in Ireland during the reign of King John, possibly at the invitation of his relative, Adam de Feypo. The family served as Lords of Killeen (requiring Knight Scutage, i.e. the supply of knights for 40 days service per year, to Hugh de Lacy, Lord of Meath, when requested).

== History ==
Cusack family connections started when Geoffrey de Cusack arrived from Cussac, northwest of Bordeaux, in the Duchy of Aquitaine, France, in 1172. Geoffrey built his castle at Killeen (Co. Meath) in 1181. Included are references to the estates acquired by some of his descendants as well as descriptions of the family Crest and Motto also the Memorial Stones and the fine Epitaph to Sir Thomas Cusack and the last of the Cusacks at Killeen—Lady Joan de Cusack.

The de Cussac Royal French connection can be studied in the Généalogiques et historique de la noblesse de France and also in Généalogie de la maison de Cusack.

The de Cussac family originally held land and influence over present-day Cussac-Fort-Medoc (45.07N, 0.43W) in France, north of Bordeaux in what was then the Duchy of Aquitaine.

Geoffrey de Cusack's arrival in Ireland was not long after the first Normans had landed in 1169.

Geoffrey was granted the manor of Killeen, 3,346 acres (13.54 km^{2}), by Adam de Feypo, a relative who obtained his lands by charter (see The Song of (King) Dermot and the Earl (Strongbow)), and like Adam, he was subject to Hugh de Lacy, Lord of Meath. Requiring, when called for, the supply of 20 knights, these received 2 marks per day for their 40-day service.

He married Matilda le Petit, sister of William le Petit who held a Barony at Mullingar and a castle at Donboyne (ORPED, ii, p. 120), sometime before 1181 and bore him at least two sons, Adam and William (English Public Records) however Irish Languish Pedigrees believe his eldest son was Geoffrey II.

Geoffrey de Cusack died between 1210 and 1218 he is the first of long lines of Cusacks in Ireland. Both the medieval and modern Cusack lines and genealogy of Geoffrey's offspring have been traced in great detail by Lt. Colonel Hubert Gallwey.

In 1399 the manors and estates of the Lordship of Killeen passed by the marriage of Lady Joan de Cusack to Christopher Plunkett of Rathragen.

=== Cusack acquisitions ===
In the intervening 220 years, between 1172 and 1399, there was sporadic hiving off from the parent stock (to various offspring), dividing up of land and the acquisition of new estates.

The descendants of Geoffrey de Cusack acquired many manors/townships—Gerrardstown, Ballymolgan, Lismullen, Troubly, Clonard, Clonmahon and Tullahard for example.

John de Cusack before 1300 obtained the manor of Dromin, Ardee Barony, County Louth.

Walter de Cusack before 1333 acquired by marriage Millistown and the castle at Knocktopher in County Kilkenny.

John de Cusack, son of Walter, obtained Belpere in Killeen parish in 1352.

John III de Cusack before 1377 obtained Cushinstown.

Symon de Cusack circa 1398 obtained Marinerstown.

== Plunder and ransom ==
There were many attacks on the Norman invaders by Irish Kings and their armies so Geoffrey and his companions saw regular service. The practice of raiding the fiefdoms of others was rife and we are fortunate to have a record of Geoffrey de Cusack doing just this.

1177 was the year de Cusack saw Connaught for the first time however the raid across the Shannon back-fired, and Geoffrey and his friends returned ruefully rubbing their bruises. If plunder is an index of success, 1178 could be counted a good year for they plundered Clonmacnoise. (AFM; cf, Curtis, HMI, p. 80; Orpen, ii, p. 92)

This was an era of chivalry, at least for the knights who fought. You might be defeated, wounded and captured but not killed. A knight was worth more alive, for ransom, than dead. The Cusacks did not escape this ignominy.

Geoffrey II and his brother William revolted against King John and were defeated, along with de Lacy, at Carrickfergus Castle in 1210. The record shows that Geoffrey II, had set against him "100 marks for his liberation" and the Justiciar was enjoined "to take no nonsense and to see to it that de Cusack promises his faithful service (to King John) before his discharge". (CDI, i, n.529)

De Cusack would have been pleased when five years later John de Lacy, a relative, was appointed one of the 25 Barons to oversee Magna Carta which King John was forced to agree to on 15 June 1215. Note a "mark" is described as being equal to 8 oz of silver (ransoms ranged from 10 to 1000 marks).

It is evident that the Cusacks interests, by the third generation, had become Irish rather than English, and also that these men could speak little or no French and had become Anglo-Irish rather than Anglo-Norman.

== Occupational summary ==
Fr. Pearse Cusack, O. Cist in his research publication The Cusacks of Killeen, Co Meath sums up the Cusack dynasty as follows:

Thus a quick review of some of the occasions in which the occupations of the de Cusack family came before the public during the 14th century reveals a compact group of skilled operators who had little to learn from modern high powered business executive. The only difference between the two species was perhaps that, whereas modern businessmen recreate themselves at golf, their medieval counterparts saw to their physical wellbeing in a more disciplined and lethal manner through their annual forays into the "land of war".

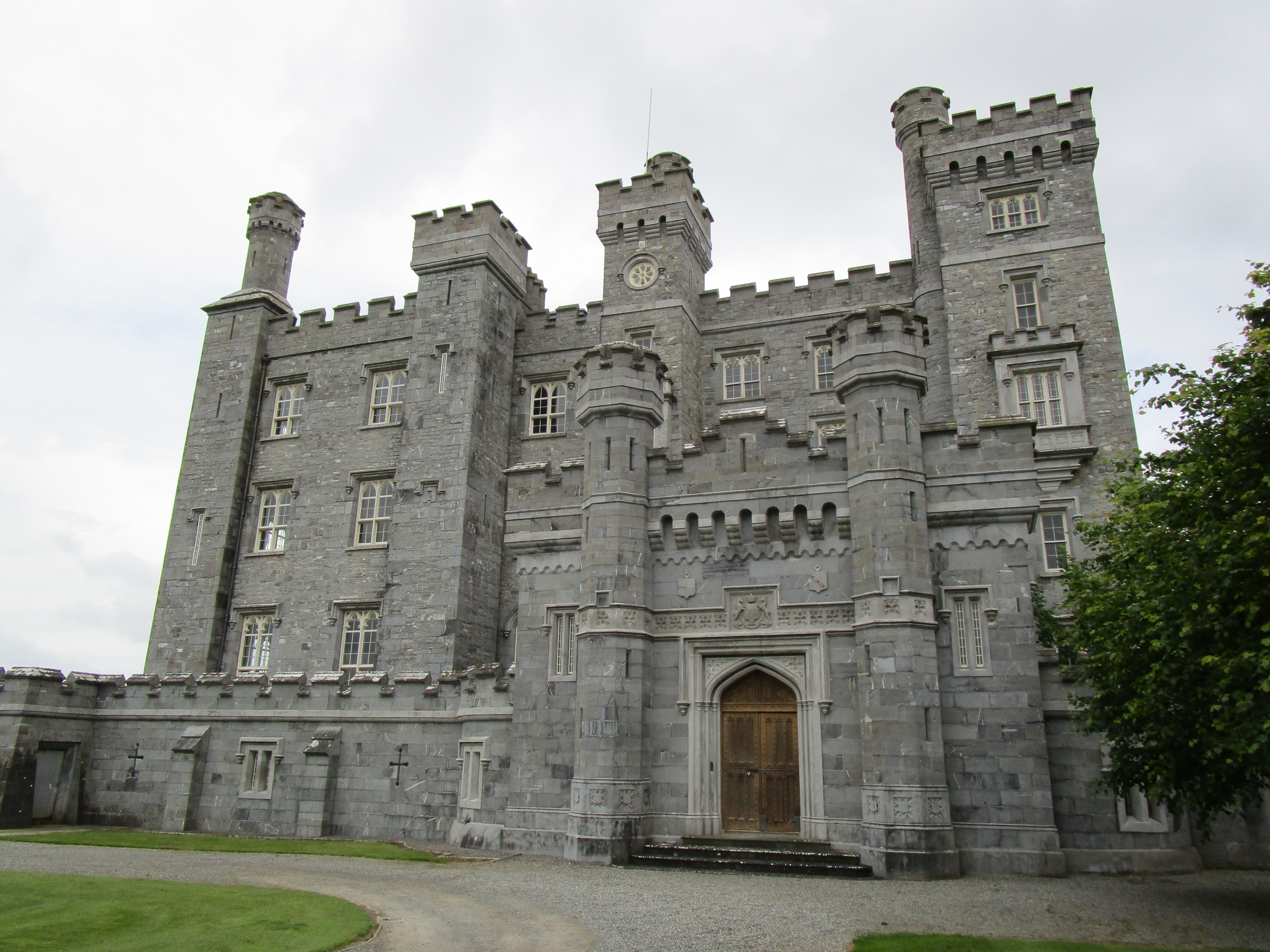
Killeen Castle

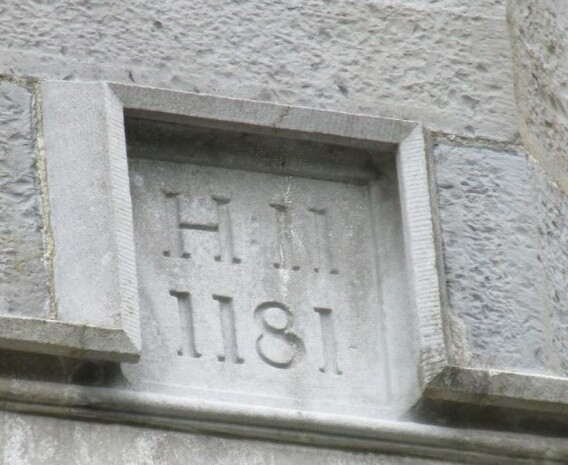
Killeen Castle

== Killeen Castle ==
Geoffrey de Cusack Lord of Killeen, having occupied his lands in 1172, built his castle. Over the doorway of Killeen Castle (see Killeen Castle Co.Meath) the date of the building is given as 1181.

An early description of Killeen Castle reads-

The date is 1 August—the feast of St. Peter's Chains — As we approach the castle we are faced by four tall battlemented towers with five storeys of slit openings linking the curtain walls of the building. The castle is set on a slight mound. We enter by a steep wooden stairway, and find ourselves, having passed through the considerable thickness of the wall from the narrow doorway, in the Great Hall on the first floor. Rushes cover the stone flags, and besides the usual furniture, such as a trestle-table, benches and the straight-backed, carved, oaken armchair of the Lord of the Manor, we note on our left a heavy green and white curtain covering one wall of the Hall. Opposite us with its sloping hood is the fireplave with logs burning in the grate. The right hand wall is hung with the Lord's war harness, his morion (helmet), hunting trophies and a feathered lure used in falconry. There is a costly piece with a perch and gilt borders. On top of an oaken chest is the Lord's great seal and some other pieces of plain silver. Opening off the Great Hall are spiral staircases leading to mezzanine rooms in the towers, bedrooms, closets and wardrobes, and also a chapel. In the Much (i.e. Great) Chamber over the Great Hall is the large bed of my Lord and Lady with its long red costereys.

A much later description reads:

The present picturesque turreted pile retains two of the original square 12th-century towers to the north of the building. The castle was built on a mound and the porch, an addition, masks the mound. However, on entering one has to climb a staircase to reach the entrance hall proper at the ground level of the original castle.

NOTE The two square towers on the right of the picture are original.

== Llanthony ==
In 1100, a nobleman came across a ruined chapel in a remote Welsh valley and decided to devote himself to solitary prayer and study. Others joined him and a community was established. Eighty-five years later Hugh de Lacy, Lord of Meath, great-grandson of the original nobleman—William de Lacy, endowed the community.

Adam de Feypo had been a De Lacy knight and was in turn a relative of Geoffrey de Cusack's, who in turn was also subject to the Lord of Meath. Hence, Geoffrey's gifts to Llanthony.

Large gifts to religious communities were recorded by Charter, and these were sent to Rome. The Pope subsequently confirmed them by Papal Letter.

Geoffrey was well established at Killeen Castle, as can be seen by the letters of 1185 and 15 Nov 1188 from Pope Clement III (CSM, i, p. 157–159) confirming the grant of Geoffrey de Cusack's 10-acre (40,000 m^{2}) gift to Llanthony Priory in Wales. (IR.CARTUL.Llanthony.77).

There were subsequent grants and gifts to Llanthony Seconda in Gloucester.

A later Charter states-

Let all people present and future know that I Geoffrey de Cusack have given and granted and by this my present charter confirmed to God and saint Mary and the conons of Llantony for pure and perpetual endowment for the salvation of my wife Matilda and of my predecssors and heirs and for the soul of my brother Richard and my lord Adam de Feypo 40 acres of arable land in Killeen or their value from other land according to a reasonable inspection of men of law in the same land and 13 acres of arable land in Biltini or their value from other land according to an inspection of men of law in the same land. From: The Irish Cartularies of Llanthony, 54

== Biltini Manor ==
The aforementioned gift of 13 acres to Llanthony is a good introduction to Biltini (today Balreagh) and its relevance today. The manor was thirty miles west of Killeen. The exact date of the acquisition Charter is not known however it was witnessed by Roger, son of Geoffrey and Matilda, and Adam de Feypo, before his death in 1190/91 (ref. IR Cartul, llanthony 239–40).

The castle Geoffrey built here on the Motte-And-Bailey was part of a Norman administrative chain and was described as being the "most spectacular".

The motte, he threw up, commands a view streatching to an almost circular horizon. A scatter of stones and traces of fortifications at the base of the mound testify that a stone castle was built here. (--- Geoffrey's castle is still, after 800 years, in use. The motte, built on the highest point of the 400ft contour line, is being used today by the Ordinance Surveyors as a triangulation point.)

Just west of Balreach the townland is still called "Geoffreystown" this, including the Charters also the presence of the motte and ruined church, is confirmation that Geoffrey de Cusack held Biltini Manor.

== Dunsany ==
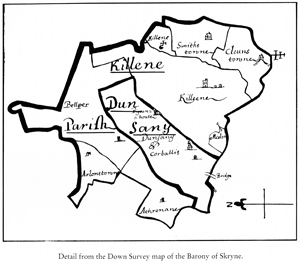

The Down Survey of the Barony of Skryne dated 1657 (original in the Bibliothèque nationale, Paris) shows as part of it the attached map. As can be seen, Killeen is recorded as a 'parish' whereas Dunsany is not. "In the 12th century, townlands were grouped together to form units called parishes, each parish supported a church or chapel. The system was not a system native to Ireland", this seems to have only applied to Norman-held lands.

The inclusion of Dunsany's 964 acres (3.90 km^{2}) in the Cusack fiefdom appears to have been in 1305 (CAR.DOC.Irl.1302-7 p. 255) as it does not appear before this in any of the 12th- and 13th-century charters. This could have been because: "the intrusive wedge of Dunsany was occupied by an Irish chieftain and his retainers, who remained ensconced there wedded to their Celtic way of life, while Norman 'improvements' were imposed all round them".

It is therefore unlikely for there to have been a "Norman" fortification/castle in Dunsany before 1305.

== Crest ==
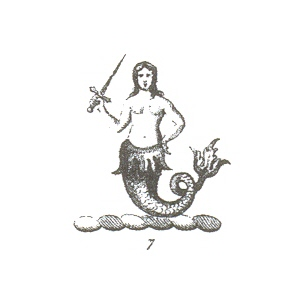
Cusack Crest

"Above the Handcock escutcheon (Stone No.3) is carved the Cusack Crest—a mermaid holding a sword in her right hand and a comb in her left hand. During the absence of Deputy St. Leger, Sir Thomas held the Sword of State. It is said, in the family papers, that this accounts for the sword held by the mermaid."

The Cusack CREST is recorded and described in The Genealogical and Historic Archives of the NOBILITY OF FRANCE as

Mermaid holding a sword in the right hand and a Sceptre Fleurdelys in the left.

Fairbairn's Book of Crests 1859 states (ref cf.184.7)

'CUSACK of Killeen, Gerrardstown, Lismullen and Clonard. Co Meath, Ireland.

A mermaid sa., holding in the dexter hand a sword, and in the sinister a sceptre ppr.

(today worn on a signet ring)

== Motto ==
The Cusack motte is shown as

En Dieu est mon Espoir (In God is my Hope).

The earliest 'hard examples in stone' of the Crest and Motto have been found on the memorial stones of Sir Thomas Cusack (1490–1571) at Trevet.

== Memorial stones ==
Memorial stones were erected as a monument to Sir Thomas Cusack (1490–1571) who after entering the Inner Temple, London in 1522 was elected to the position of Master of the Revels in 1524 returned to Ireland as Second Justice of the Court of Common Pleas (Ireland). Sir Thomas became Chancellor of the Exchequer of Ireland, held the office of Master of the Rolls in Ireland, Keeper of the Great Seal of Ireland and became Lord Chancellor of Ireland. The research into these stones are thanks to historian Elizabeth Hickey.

Note that the stones would have originally been painted in vivid colours to bring out the three-dimensional effect.

=== Stone No.1 ===
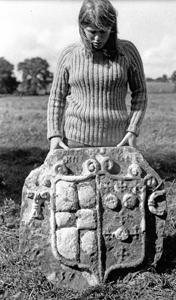
Stone No.1 Photograph

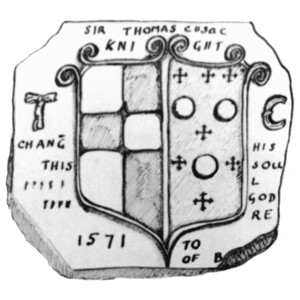
Sketch of carving on the stone

Octagonal in shape, approx 0.8m dia. - lies in front of Staffordstown House, Navan – shows the Cusack arms and above is carved "Sir Thomas Cusack Knight" and the date 1571 on the left-hand side of the shield. The lettering on the stone does not show up in the photograph hence the sketch was made.

=== Stone No.2 ===
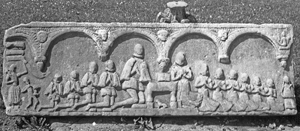
Sir Thomas, Wife and Children

Measures 2.35 m × 0.75 m—moved to Skryne Parish Church around 1945—shows Sir Thomas with his second wife and their 13 children. The family crest—a mermaid—is carved on the top right corner. Behind the kneeling Sir Thomas, are his four sons while opposite, behind Dame Maud, are six of her daughters. The two girls standing are the remaining daughters, they carry the judge's mace and the Lord Chancellor's purse. The third figure is of a boy with a bowl in his left hand and a pipe in his right through which he is blowing bubbles towards the youngest kneeling child who seems to bend slightly away from his brother. The blowing of bubbles is taken to represent the transitoriness of human life. Under the table is carved a dog.

=== Stone No.3 ===
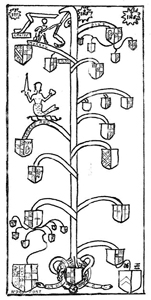
family tree with Mermaid and Motto

Measures 1.2 m × 2.5 6m—lies in the ruined choir of Trevet Church. This stone is broken. On this is carved a family tree originating from a heraldic shield with the Cusack coat of arms on the dexter side. The laurel wreath still carries some of the Cusack motto En Dieu est mon Espoir. Furthermore, on the tree appears the Cusack Crest described as "The Mermaid holding a Sword in her right hand and what appears to be a comb in her left". The modern crest differs slightly. At the top of the stone, there are three suns with the letters I.H.S. surmounted by a cross in each. It is a Franciscan device to show that devotion to Christ should supersede earthly loyalties. The reason for the three suns could have been in memory of the three Sir Thomas children who were dead when the stone was carved.

=== Stone No.4 ===
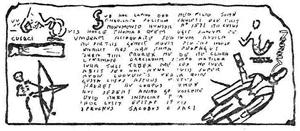
Sketch of the Epitaph

Measures 2.15 m × 0.87 m—lies in the ruins of Trevet Church. This stone is broken. Carved on it is Sir Thomas's epitaph, which has been translated as follows, by the late Professor R. M. Gwynn of Trinity College, Dublin. On the bottom left can be seen the skeletal figure of Death with a long bow firing an arrow at the recumbent figure of Sir Thomas who holds an hourglass which shows that the sands of time have passed for him. The mermaid crest is shown in the top right.

=== Sir Thomas's Epitaph ===
Under this monument of stone which was wrought,
polished, and carved by my son John am I interred,
in the year 1571, for whose faithful soul pray ye faithful,
Thou dost wish to find Thomas, whom this slab conceals,
thou seekest a departed spirit, search elsewhere.
An eagle will produce a true-born progeny.

Virtue begat me,
Piety cherished me,
Honour increased me,
Skill set me on high,
I departed this life.

Let long lived Renown hand down my name,
As Lord High Chancellor I administered the laws.
By the gods me a distinguished wife blessed,
Matilda sprung from the stock of the Dareys.
As a judge I administered the laws;
Statutes and laws brought me blessing,
Laws skilled to hammer into shape rugged spirits.
He has departed but for him what further is in store, dost enquire?
Hear the words of him as he speaks, nay rather hear the sounds.

My deeds in books,
In the stars my worth,
In report my renown abides,
In the ground my body,
My name and myself in heven,
Myself in heven.

On earth my likeness is renewed by my offspring which thou
O Holy Matilda on thy holy wedding couch didst conceive.
Whoever is resolved to know more of my kin let him scan
the tale which the table fixed on the wall relates.

== Lady Joan de Cusack ==
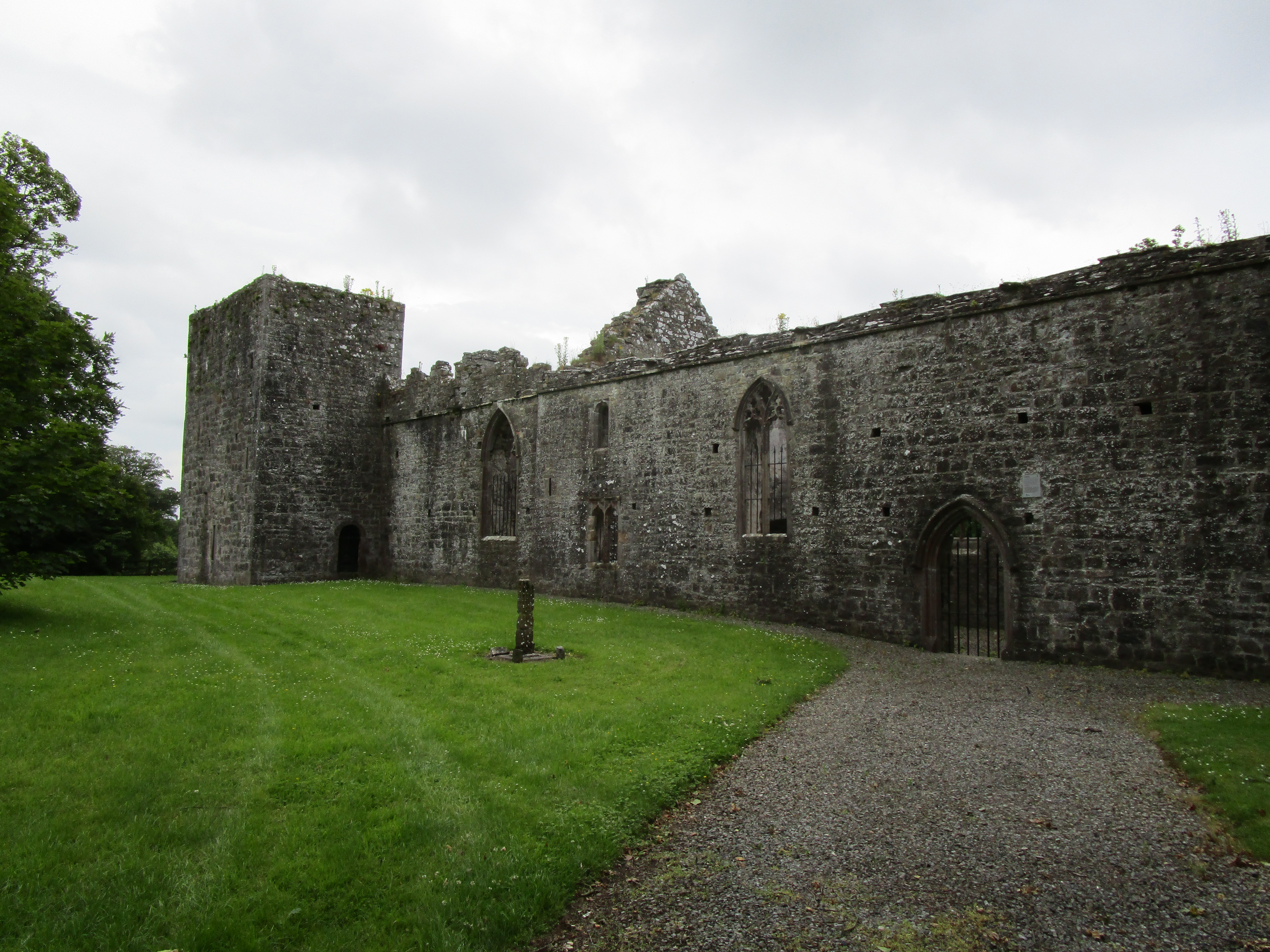
Ruined Church at Killeen Castle

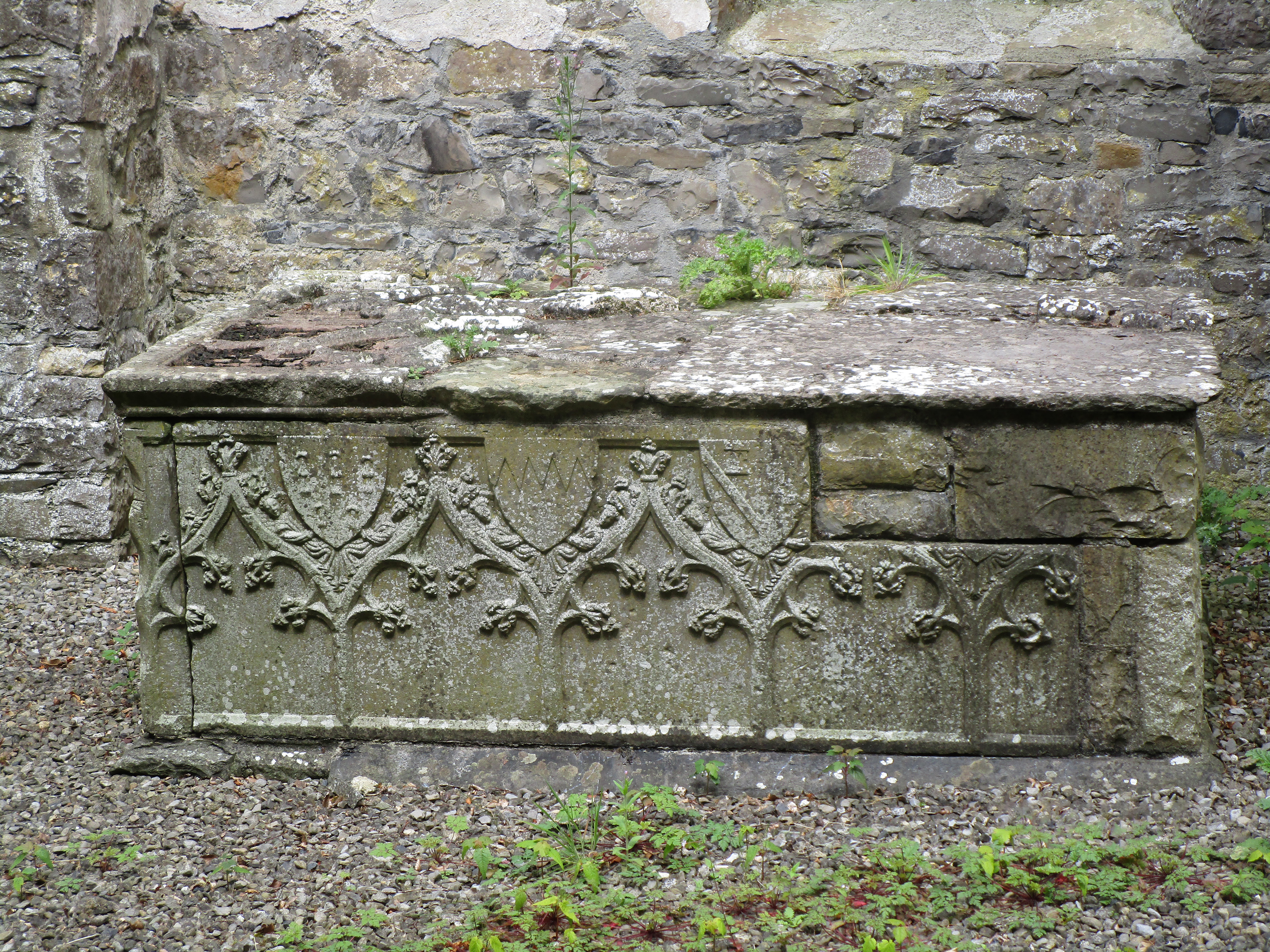
Stone Coffin in the Churchyard at Killeen Castle

Lady Joan de Cusack, daughter of Sir Lucas de Cusack, Lord of Killeen, and Matilda Flemming, daughter of the Baron of Slane, married Sir Christopher Plunkett of Rathregan in 1399.

Sir Christopher joined her as Lord of Killeen at the Castle.

Lady Joan de Cusack as an heiress brought not only the parish and the castles of Killeen and Dunsany but also the following manors and tenements to her husband. (we must remember that a manor often involved thousands of acres). In the parish of Kilskire, the townlands of Boltown, Kilskire and Robbinstown. In the parish of Killallon, Galboystown, Seraghstown and Glehalstown. These two parishes are adjacent in the Barony of Fore, Co Meath in which she also had seisen of Loughcrew. Also in what is now the Barony of Lower Navan, in the parish of Clonmacduff, she owned Ballardin and Tullahanstown. Finally the townland of Cloney closes the list.(ref Pontifico Hibernica II, pp. 210–11)

The Chantry church, outside Killeen Castle, built by the last of the Cusacks in Killeen, Joan, and her husband, Christopher Plunkett, is now a national monument. It was endowed with the object of having Masses and Prayers offered for the donors, their forebears and posterity, and doubtless inspired partly by the little ruin that gave its name to the castle, and also partly by the fact that Lady Joan was the last of a long line of Cusacks to live in Killeen Castle for 269 years. The names of the Cusacks and Plunketts on the mortuary inscriptions in the church have been listed and a Robert Cusack Esq. and Margaret Plunkett are recorded being buried here in 1620. (ref. Beryl Moore: The Tombs in St Mary's ruined Church, Killeen)

The tomb stone is directly in front of the altar and displays -

A knight and his lady carved in low relief surmounted by a rich double canopy. The lady is lying on her husband's right and wears a bullock's hoof-shaped head dress, her feet rest on a cushion. The knight is cleanshaven and his feet rest on a small sporting dog. Both have their hands doubled up flat on their chests. They are Sir Christopher Plunkett and Lady Joan Cusack who married in 1399.

A portion of the black-lettered inscription which runs along the edge can still be read and it gives their names and says they 'caused this church to be built'

Sir Christopher and Lady Joan had two male children—John Plunkett, the elder, inherited Killeen Castle and Christopher Plunkett, the younger, inherited Dunsany Castle. There appears to be no definitive record of how their mother's inheritance (ref. Carew.MSS, V, p. 357) was shared between them. However, what they and the Cusacks, down the years, do share is that Norman Knight ancestor who came to Ireland in 1172 – Geoffrey de Cusack.

== Notable people named Cusack ==
=== Given name ===
- Cusack Roney (1781–1849), Irish surgeon
- Cusack Patrick Roney (1809–1868), Irish civil servant

== Sources ==
- Cusack, Fr.P. (1981). The Cusacks of Killeen, Co. Meath. O.Cist.
- Hickey, Elizabeth (1971). "Monument to Sir Thomas Cusack". Records of Meath Archaeological & Historical Society. IV (5). Meath, Ireland: Meath Archaeological & Historical Society: 76.
- Hickey, Elizabeth (1994). Skryne and the Early Normans: Papers Concerning the Medieval Manors of the de Feypo Family in Ireland in the 12th and Early 13th Centuries. Meath, Ireland: Meath Archaeological and Historical Society. OCLC 31658348.
- Moore, Dr. (1981). "Tombs in St Marys ruined Church, Killeen". Records of Meath Archaeological & Historical Society.
