= Costello (surname) =

- Pronunciation: /kɒˈstɛloʊ, kəˈstɛloʊ/ also /ˈkɒst(ə)loʊ/ in Ireland; Italian: [koˈstɛllo]
- Language: English

Origin
- Languages: 1. Irish; 2. French
- Origin: 1. Mac Oisdealbhaigh; 2. coste
- Derivation: 1. Irish: os + dealbhadh 2. Latin: costa
- Meaning: 1. 'son of' (a person resembling) a 'young deer' 2. 'coast'

Other names
- Variant forms: McCostalaighe, McCosdalowe, (Mc)Costelloe, Costellow, Costily, Costley

Costello is a surname of Irish origin, which has been used as a stage name by Italians and others.

== History ==
The Irish surnames Costello and Costellow are anglicized forms of the Gaelic surname Mac Oisdealbhaigh, itself a Gaelicized form of an Anglo-Norman name. This was the first example of a Norman family assuming a Gaelic name.

This surname has been mainly borne by a notable Irish family who claimed descent from Jocelyn de Angulo, an Anglo-Norman mercenary who accompanied Richard de Clare to Ireland in 1170 during the Anglo-Norman invasion of Ireland.

An early record of the name in Ireland appears in the 17th century Annals of the Four Masters where the name is mentioned in the entry for the year in 1193: "Inis Clothrann do orgain la macaibh Oisdealb, & la macaibh Conchobhair Maonmaighe." (Inishcloghbran was plundered by the sons of Oisdealb, and the sons of Conor Moinmoy.) The descendants of Oisdealb then became referred to by the family name Mac Oisdealbhaigh (son of Oisdealb).

Costello has also occasionally has been adopted as a pseudonym or stage name by famous people largely of Italian descent, including Al Costello (né Giacomo Costa), Frank Costello (né Francesco Castiglia) and Lou Costello (né Louis Francis Cristillo).

Notable people with the name include:

- Al Costello (1919–2000), the ring name of Italian-Australian professional wrestler Giacomo Costa
- Anthony Costello (born 1953), British paediatrician and professor
- Anthony J. Costello, Australian urologist
- Ashley Costello, Lead vocalist for New Years Day
- Barry M. Costello (born 1951), United States Navy vice admiral
- Billy Costello (boxer) (1956–2011), American boxer
- Brian Costello (born 1963), American professional wrestler
- Cormac Costello (born 1994), Gaelic football player
- Carol Costello (born 1961), American news reporter
- Dan E. Costello (born 1909), American politician
- Daniel Rae Costello (born 1961), Pacific musician
- Declan Costello (1926–2011) Irish High Court judge
- Desmond Patrick Costello (1912–1964), linguist, soldier, diplomat and academic
- Diosa Costello (1913–2013), American actress
- Dolores Costello (1903–1979), American film actress
- Dougie Costello (born 1983), Irish jockey
- Dubhaltach Caoch Mac Coisdealbhaigh (died 1667), Irish soldier and rapparee
- Edward Costello (1887–1916), Irish Citizen Army volunteer who died during the Easter Rising
- Elvis Costello (born 1954), English singer and musician, born Declan Patrick MacManus
- Frank Costello (1891–1973), American criminal and mobster (born in Italy as Francesco Castiglia; took the Costello name in the 1920s)
- Frank Costello (footballer) (1884–1914), English footballer who played for Southampton and West Ham United
- Helene Costello (1906–1957), American film actress
- Herman T. Costello (1920–2017), American politician
- Jensine Costello, (1886–1973), Norwegian painter
- Jerry Costello (born 1949), American politician
- Joe Costello (politician) (born 1945), Irish Labour Party politician
- John Costello (baseball) (born 1960), American baseball pitcher
- John Costello (historian) (1943–1995), British historian
- John Costello (Medal of Honor recipient) (1850–?), U.S. Navy sailor and Medal of Honor recipient
- John Costello (pastoralist) (1838–1923), Australian pastoralist
- John A. Costello (1891–1976), Taoiseach of Ireland
- John M. Costello (1903–1976), U.S. Representative from California
- Joseph Costello (electronic design automation) (born 1953), American computer scientist
- Joseph Arthur Costello (1915–1978), American Catholic bishop
- Larry Costello (1931–2001), American professional basketball coach
- Les Costello (1928–2002), Canadian ice hockey player and Catholic priest
- Lou Costello (1906–1959), Italian-American actor and comedian (born Louis Francis Cristillo), part of Abbott and Costello
- Louis B. Costello (1876–1959), American businessman and newspaper editor
- Louisa Stuart Costello (1799–1870), British author and poet
- Mark Costello (disambiguation), several people
- Matt Costello (born 1993), basketball player
- Matthew J. Costello (born 1948), American science fiction author
- Maurice Costello (1877–1950), American stage and screen actor
- Michael Costello (fashion designer), American fashion designer
- Michael Costello (public servant), ex-chief of staff to Australian politician Kim Beazley
- Michael A. Costello (born 1965), state representative for the Massachusetts House of Representatives
- Michael Copps Costello (1875–1936), Canadian politician
- Mike Costello, British sports broadcaster
- Michael Joe Costello (1904–1986), Irish Army general
- Murray Costello, Canadian member of the Hockey Hall of Fame
- Nigel Costello (born 1968), English professional footballer
- Paul Costello, American rower and Olympic medalist
- Peter Costello, multiple people
- Quinn Costello, American basketball player
- Robert Costello (1921–2014), American TV and film producer, writer, and director
- Ryan Anthony Costello (born 1976), American attorney and politician
- Ryan Christopher Costello (1996–2019), American baseball player
- Seamus Costello, Irish politician, and member of the Irish Republican Army
- Sean Costello, American blues musician
- Stephen Costello, American opera tenor
- Sue Costello American comedian and actress
- Tim Costello, Australian Baptist minister and author
- Thomas Joseph Costello (1929–2019), American Roman Catholic bishop
- Victor Costello, Irish rugby union player
- Vince Costello (1932–2019), American football player
- Ward Costello, American actor
- William Costello (1932–2014), American animal scientist

== See also ==
- Castello (surname)
- Castillo (surname)
- Costello (disambiguation)
- Costelloe (disambiguation)
