= Miles de Angulo =

Anglo-Irish knight and baron

Miles de Angulo (Irish: Miles Bregach Mac Goisdelbh) Anglo-Irish knight and baron, fl. 1245–1259.

Son of Phillip fitz William de Angulo. Called by the Irish 'Mac Goisdelbh' (i.e., the son of Jocelyn). Walter de Lacy gave a grant of Conmaicne to the Baron of Navan and Miles fought for him there. He built Athachip castle in 1245, but was driven out in 1247. He later became the lord of Sliabh Lugha in Castlemore, in what would later be called the barony of Costello.

Miles was married to a daughter of Hugh de Lacy, 1st Earl of Ulster; upon her death, she was buried at Boyle Abbey, in County Roscommon. Miles died in 1259, and was succeeded in the title by his eldest son Hugh. He had three sons Hugh (died 1260?), Gilbert Mor and Phillip (died 1288), and a daughter, Eleanor, who married Hugh Boy O'Neill, ancestor of the Clandeboye O'Neill dynasty.
