= Condello =

Condello is an Italian surname. Notable people with the surname include:

- Domenico Condello (born 1956), Italian criminal, member of the 'Ndrangheta criminal organisation
- Mario Condello (1952–2006), Italian-Australian lawyer and criminal, member of the Carlton Crew and the 'Ndrangheta criminal organisations
- Mike Condello (1946–1995), American musician, founder of rock band Condello
- Pasquale Condello (born 1950), Italian criminal, member of the 'Ndrangheta criminal organisation
- Tony Condello (born August 1942), Italian retired professional wrestler

== See also ==
- Castello (surname)
- Costello (surname)
