= Costelloe =

Costelloe may refer to:

- Casla, English name Costelloe, a village in western County Galway, Ireland

== People ==
- Dara Costelloe (born 2002), Irish footballer
- John Costelloe (politician) (1900–?), Irish politician, member of Seanad Éireann from 1963 to 1965
- John Costelloe (actor) (1961–2008), American actor
- Noel Costelloe (fl. 2011), Irish hurling player
- Paul Costelloe (1945–2025), Irish fashion designer and artist
- Timothy Costelloe (been 1954), Australian metropolitan bishop
- Timothy M. Costelloe (born 1964), American philosopher

== See also ==
- Costello (disambiguation)
- Costello (surname)
