= The Song of Dermot and the Earl =

Anonymous Anglo-Norman verse chronicle

- by Unknown
- Translator: G.H.C. Orpen
- Written: early 13th century
- First published in: 1892
- Country: England
- Language: Anglo-Norman
- Subject: Anglo-Norman invasion of Ireland
- Genre: chanson de geste
- Form: Heroic couplet
- Meter: Iambic tetrameter
- Rhyme scheme: aa bb cc ...
- Lines: 3459

The Song of Dermot and the Earl (French: Chanson de Dermot et du comte) is an anonymous Anglo-Norman verse chronicle written in the early 13th century in England. It tells of the arrival of Richard de Clare (Strongbow) in Ireland in 1170 (the "earl" in the title), and of the subsequent arrival of Henry II of England. The poem mentions one Morice Regan, secretary to Diarmaid mac Murchadha, king of Leinster, who was eyewitness to the events and may have provided an account to the author.

The chronicle survives only in a single manuscript which was re-discovered in the 17th century in London. The work bears no title in the manuscript, but has been commonly referred to as The Song of Dermot and the Earl since Goddard Henry Orpen in 1892 published a diplomatic edition under this title. It has also been known as The Conquest of Ireland and The Conquest of Ireland by Henry II; in the most recent edition it was called La Geste des Engleis en Yrlande ("The Deeds of the English in Ireland").

== Lines from The Song of (King) Dermot and the Earl (Strongbow) ==
This section of the poem has been translated from Anglo-Norman French by G.H.C. Orpen (Trinity College, Dublin) from the Carew 596 manuscript and covers lines 3129 - 3161 (see Skryne and the Early Normans (1994) by Elizabeth Hickey. p. 31).

Original Anglo-Norman
De Huge de Laci vus conterai,

Cum il feffa ses baruns,
chevalers, serjans e garsunz.
Chastelknoc tut premer donat
A Huge Tyrel, k'il tant amat;
E Chastel Brec, solum l'escrit,
A barun Willame le petit,
Macherueran altresi
E la tere de Rathkenni.
Le cantref pus de Hadhnorkur
A Meiler, qui ert de grant valur,
Donad Huge de Laci
Al bon Meiler le fiz Henri.
A Gilibert de Nangle enfin
Donad tut Makerigalin;
A Jocelin donat le Novan
E la tere de Ardbrechan:
Li un ert fiz, li altre pere,
Solum le dit de la mere.
A Richard Tuit ensement
Donad riche feffement;
Ratwor donat altresi
Al barun Robert de Lacy;
A Richard de la Chapele
Tere donad bone e bele;
A Geffrei de Constantyn Kelberi
A memes de Ratheimarthi;
E Scrin ad pus en chartre,
Adam de Feipo l'ad pus doné;
A Gilibert de Nungent,
A Willame de Muset ensement
Donat teres e honurs,
Veant baruns e vassaurs;

English translation
"Of Hugh de Lacy I shall tell you

How he enfeoffed his barons,
Knights, serjeants and retainers.
Castleknock, in the first place, he gave
To Hugh Tyrell, whom he loved so much;
And Castle Brack according to the writing,
To baron William le Petit,
Magherdernon likewise
And the land of Rathkenny,
The cantred of Ardnorcher then
To Meiller, who was of great worth,
Gave Hugh de Lacy-
To the good Meiler Fitz Henry;
To Gilbert de Nangle, moreover
He gave the whole of Morgallion;
To Jocelin he gave the Naven,
And the lands of Ardbrackan,
(The one was son the other father,
According to the statement of the mother)
To Richard de Tuite likewise
He gave rich fief;
Rathwire he gave moreover
To the baron Robert de Lacy.
To Richard de la Chapell
He gave good and fine land,
To Geoffrey de Constantine Kilbixi
Near to Rathconarty;
And Skryne he gave by charter;
To Adam de Feypo he gave it;
To Gilbert de Nugent,
And likewise to William de Musset,
He gave lands and honours,
In the presence of barons and vavasours."

== See also ==
- Anglo-Norman literature
- Hiberno-Norman
- Norman Ireland
- Diarmait Mac Murchada (Dermot)
- Kingdom of Ossory

== Editions and translations ==
- Mullally, Evelyn, ed. and tr. (2002). The Deeds of the Normans in Ireland: La geste des Engleis en yrlande: a new edition of the chronicle formerly known as The Song of Dermot and the Earl. Dublin: Four Courts. ISBN 1-85182-643-2.
- Conlon, Denis J., ed. and tr. (1992). The Song of Dermot and Earl Richard Fitzgilbert: Le chansun de Dermot e li quens Ricard fiz Gilbert. Studien und Dokumente zür Geschichte der romanischen Literaturen, herausgegeben von Hans-Joachim Lope 24. Frankfurt/Main: Peter Lang.
- Orpen, G.H., ed. and tr. (1892). The Song of Dermot and the Earl: an Old French Poem from the Carew Manuscript no. 596 in the Archiepiscopal Library at Lambeth Palace. Oxford. Diplomatic edition
  - Edition at CELT
  - PDF scan at archive.org
- Anglo-Norman poem on the conquest of Ireland by Henry the Second (1837). Edited by Francisque Xaview Michel. With an introductory essay on the history of the Anglo-Norman conquest of Ireland, by Thomas Wright.
