= Conquest of Ireland =

Conquest of Ireland may refer to:

- Norman invasion of Ireland
  - Expugnatio Hibernica (Conquest of Ireland), a contemporary account of the invasion by Gerald of Wales
  - The Song of Dermot and the Earl, also called the Conquest of Ireland, a 13th-century account of the invasion by an anonymous author
- Tudor conquest of Ireland
- Cromwellian conquest of Ireland
