= Costello (barony) =

Ancient barony of Ireland

Costello Coistealaigh (Irish)
- Barony
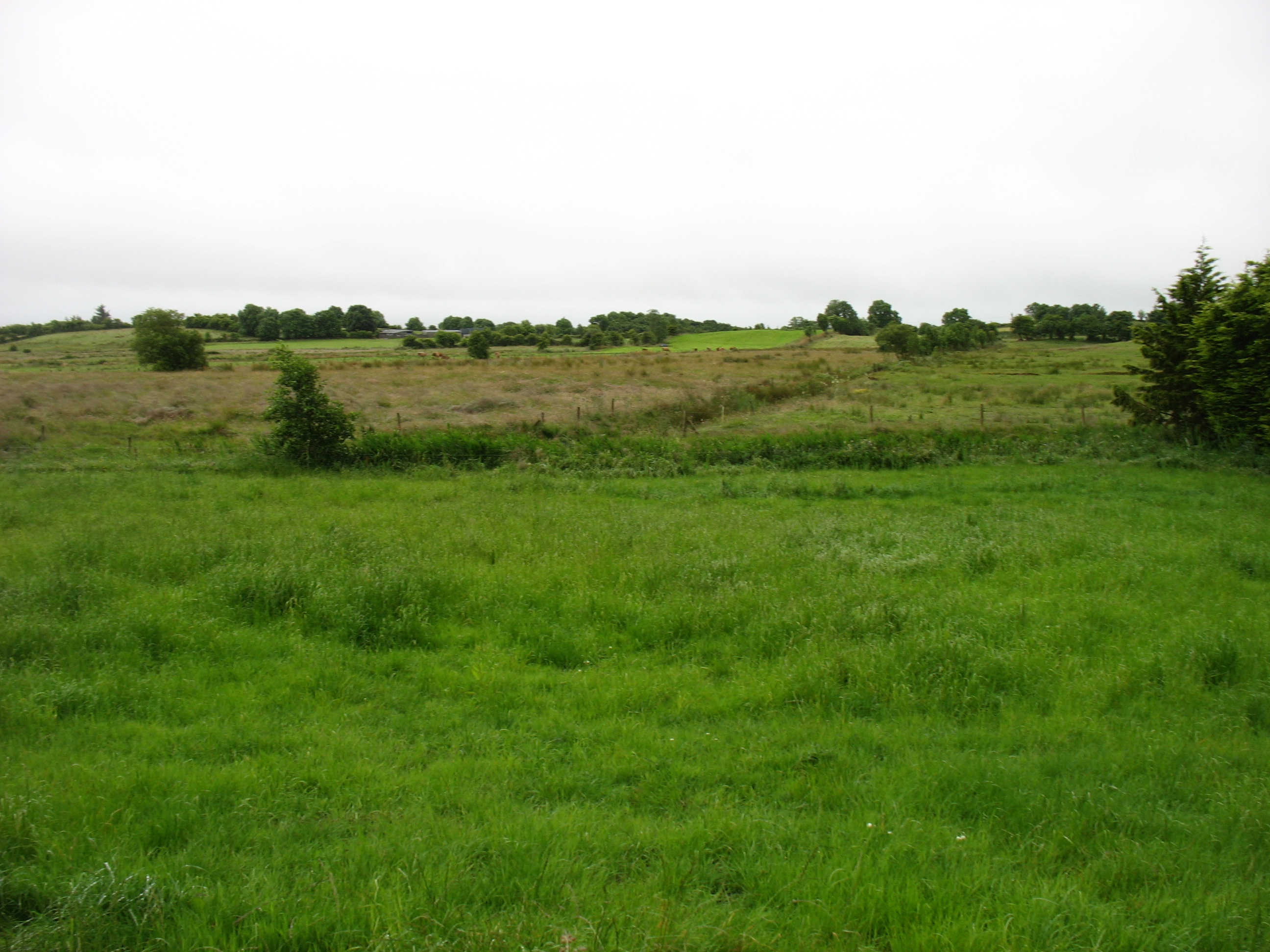
- Farmland near Cloonfallagh

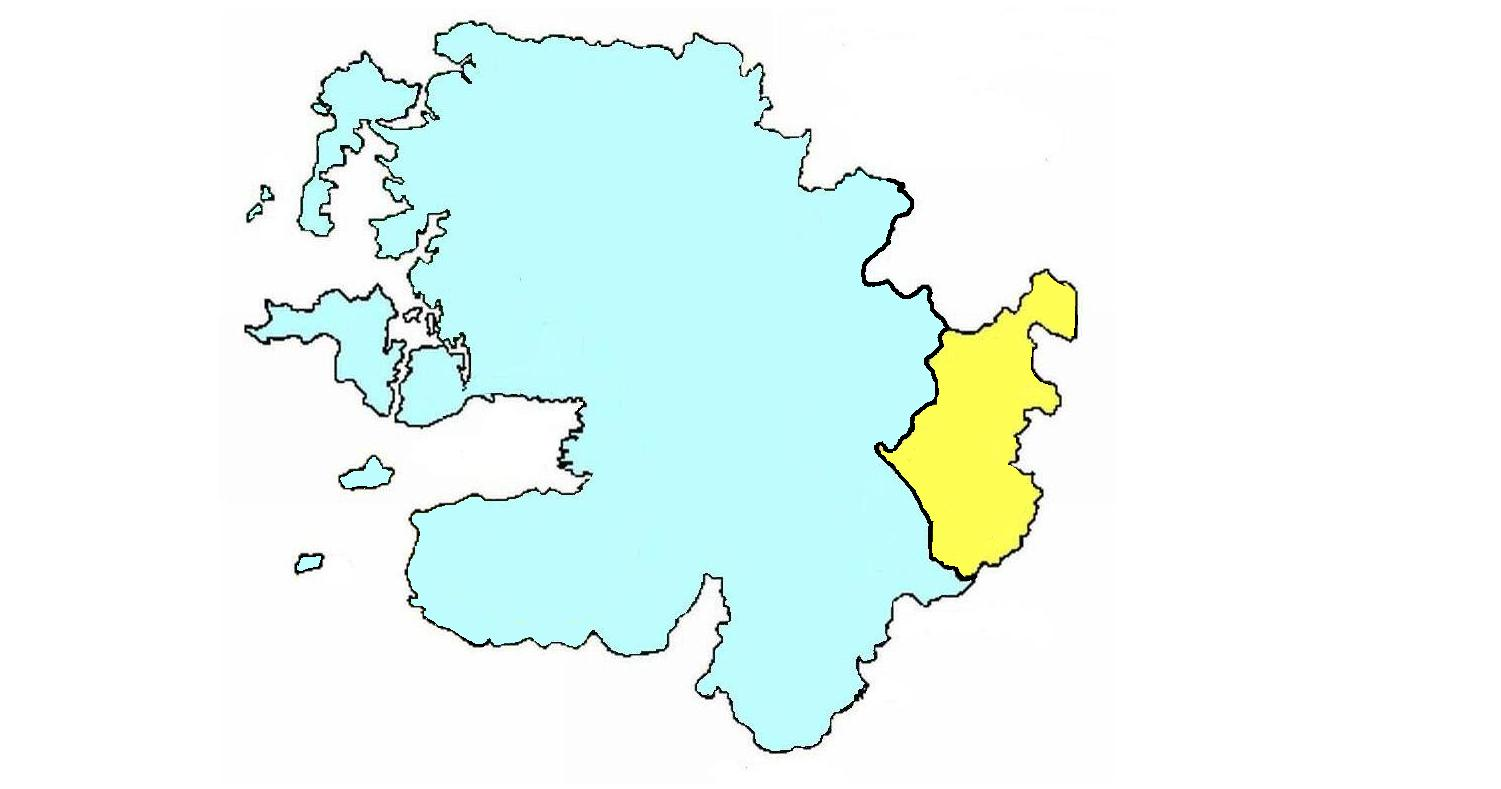
- Barony map of County Mayo, 1900; Costello is yellow

- Location within Ireland
- Coordinates: 53°50′N 8°47′W
- Sovereign state: Ireland
- Province: Connacht
- County: Mayo; Roscommon

Area
  - Total: 582.2 km^{2} (224.8 sq mi)

Costello is one of the ancient baronies of Ireland. Unusually for an Irish barony, it straddles two counties: County Mayo and County Roscommon. It comprises the modern day districts of Kilkelly, Kilmovee, Killeagh, Kilcolman, and Castlemore.

Prior to the Norman conquest of Ireland, the area was called Sliabh Lugha and was ruled by the Ó Gadhra dynasty. In the 12th century, Milo de Angelo removed the O'Gadhra seat from Airtech Mór to Costello. He built a castle there, known as Castlemore. The Ó Céirín (Kearns) family also had a presence as lords of Ciarraige Locha na nÁirne.

== Name ==
The Costello family who gave their name to the Barony were originally Nangles, or de Angulos, who came to Connacht with the Anglo Normans in the 12th century. Gilbert de Angulo, Baron of Navan, arrived with his brothers who had been outlawed and expelled from their lands in Meath in 1195. They were later pardoned in 1206. In a number of grants to outlawed Norman lords at this time by Cathal Crobhdearg, King of Connacht, Gilbert and his brothers were given Máenmag and Cairbre Drom Cliabh. The first reference to this family is in the Annals of the Four Masters in 1193. The sons of one of the first Nangles, Gilbert de Nangle, became known as the Oistealb, and gave rise to the surname Mac Oisdealbh, later MacOisdealbhaigh, anglicised to MacCostello. It was the first recorded instance of a Norman family assuming an Irish 'Mac' name. From that time forward, they became thoroughly Irish. The family had focused their interests on grants in Breifne from 1221 until their expulsion in 1248 and after Gilbert's brother William de Angulo received the grant of Sliabh Lugha in the conquest of Connacht of Richard Mór de Burgh, 'Lord of Connacht' this focus shifted to the development of the Connacht holdings, now the Barony of Costello.

The MacCostello land was in the part of Mayo now known as the Barony of Costello until the end of the 16th century. In 1565, their seat of power was near Ballaghaderreen (now part of County Roscommon). Their name, although the Mac has now been dropped, is a common surname in both Mayo and County Galway where it is usually spelt with an extra 'e' at the end.

The Costellos were one of the many great Irish families which, during the seventeenth-century destruction of everything Gaelic, produced famous rapparees who fought against Oliver Cromwell and the parliamentarians.

The local Costello landholders lost title to their lands to Theobald Dillon, 1st Viscount Dillon in some sharp practices during the period of the Tudor reconquest in the province of Connacht. To save expense and ensure the smooth legal transfer he persuaded them to allow him surrender their lands for them in one land-title in the surrender and regrant process and have it regranted in his name, becoming the legal landowner in the process. He never returned the land-title to the native owners as had been intended. The title of Viscount Dillon of Costello-Gallen, was especially created for him in the Peerage of Ireland in 1622 when Lord President of Connaught confirming his position. This would lead to rapparee actions by Dudley (or Dubhaltach Caoch) Costello against the Dillons in the seventeenth century. Dudley was an officer in the army of the Confederate Catholics in 1642, and later became a colonel in the Spanish army. Returning to Ireland after the Restoration and disappointed by his failure to recover the family estates, he devoted the rest of his life to wreaking vengeance on the new Dillon proprietors until his death in 1667.

Loughglynn, built c. 1715, was the seat, or main residence, of the Dillon family in Costello who became absentee landlords in the nineteenth century. The land remained with the Dillon family until Harold Dillon, 17th Viscount Dillon sold the estate in counties Mayo and Roscommon, amounting to 93,652 acres, to the Congested Districts' Board on 11 May 1899.

== Civil parishes ==
Civil parishes located in County Mayo:

- Aghamore
- Annagh
- Bekan
- Castlemore (Part of - 53 townlands)
- Kilbeagh (Part of - 69 townlands)
- Kilmovee
- Kilturra
- Knock

Civil parishes located in County Roscommon:

- Castlemore (Part of - 4 townlands)
- Kilbeagh (Part of - 5 townlands)
- Kilcolman (Part of - 2 townlands)

By the terms of the County of Roscommon Act, 1840, two townlands of the parish of Kilcoman were detached from the barony of Costello in Mayo and transferred to the barony of Frenchpark in Roscommon. The townlands remained in the parish of Kilcolman. The townlands moved to Frenchpark are Banada and Keelbanada The 1840 Act also transferred four townlands of the parish of Castlemore to the barony of Frenchpark: Aghalustia, Cappagh, Lissian and Roosky The four lay to the right bank or southern side of the River Lung, detached from the other townlands of the parish.

== Population centres ==
- Ballyhaunis
- Charlestown
- Kilkelly
- Knock
