= Baron of Navan =

Irish feudal barony

The Barony of Navan was an Irish feudal barony which was held by the de Angulo family, whose name became Nangle. It was a customary title: in other words, the holder of the title was always referred to as a Baron, and this privilege was in practice hereditary, but the Baron was not a peer in the strict sense, and was not entitled to a seat in the Irish House of Lords.

The title was conferred by Hugh de Lacy, Lord of Meath, on his trusted lieutenant Jocelyn de Angulo, in or about the year 1172. Jocelyn is thought to have taken his surname from his birthplace at Angle, Pembrokeshire. Junior branches of the Nangle dynasty founded the Nagle and Costello families. Jocelyn acquired not only Navan but also Morgallion and Ardbraccan. His building of Navan Fort is generally regarded as marking the foundation of the town of Navan.

Jocelyn's son Gilbert de Angulo, the 2nd Baron, rebelled against Richard I in 1195. He was attainted and his estates declared forfeit to the Crown; but he was later pardoned by King John. He was killed in a skirmish in 1212 or 1213.

The family acquired wealth and substantial lands, but they played an obscure role in Irish history. John Nangle, 16th Baron of Navan, like most of the Anglo-Irish nobility of the time, supported the Yorkist pretender to the Crown, Lambert Simnel, and after the defeat of Simnel's cause at the Battle of Stoke, he shared in the general pardon issued by Henry VII of England. Described as a lusty warrior, he fought on the winning side at the Battle of Knockdoe in 1504. Patrick, 18th Baron, was one of the Anglo-Irish nobles of the Pale who were involved in the cess controversy of 1577, concerning the Crown's right to levy taxes for the upkeep of garrisons, and was briefly imprisoned for non-payment of the tax.

Peter Nangle, a younger son of Thomas, 17th Baron, was in the entourage of Hugh O'Neill, 2nd Earl of Tyrone and played some part in the events leading to the Flight of the Earls. In the early seventeenth century the family increased their influence by marrying into powerful "New English" families like the Boltons and Loftuses.

Thomas, 19th Baron, took part in the Irish Rebellion of 1641, and signed the "Catholic Remonstrance" issued at Trim, County Meath in March 1642 addressed to King Charles I of England. As a result, he was attainted as a traitor and forfeited much of his property. Although his son George, 21st Baron (who succeeded his brother Patrick), recovered part of the family estates at the Restoration of Charles II, the family's fortunes had begun to decline. John, 21st Baron, was a supporter of James II of England: after the Glorious Revolution he was attainted and the Nangles left Ireland for good. Patrick, 23rd Baron, was a soldier in the French Army, and supporter of the Old Pretender. Francis, 24th and last Baron, spent many years serving in the Austrian Army; he died unmarried in Vienna in 1781, when the title became extinct.

== Barons of Navan 1172-1781 ==
- Jocelyn de Angulo, 1st Baron of Navan (fl. 1172)
- Gilbert de Angulo, 2nd Baron of Navan (died 1212/3)
- William de Angulo, 3rd Baron of Navan
- Philip de Angulo, 4th Baron of Navan
- Miles de Angulo, 5th Baron of Navan
- Hugh de Angulo, 6th Baron of Navan
- Jordan de Angulo, 7th Baron of Navan (living 1266)
- John de Nangle, 8th Baron of Navan (living 1325)
- Barnaby de Nangle, 9th Baron of Navan (living 1346)
- William de Nangle, 10th Baron of Navan (died before 1377)
- Barnaby de Nangle, 11th Baron of Navan
- John Nangle, 12th Baron of Navan (died 1407)
- Walter Nangle, 13th Baron of Navan (succeeded his father in 1407)
- Barnaby Nangle, 14th Baron of Navan (killed in a skirmish at Barlaston (Bardanstown) 1435)
- Thomas Nangle, 15th Baron of Navan, brother of the preceding (born 1431, living 1470)
- John Nangle, 16th Baron of Navan (died 1517)
- Thomas Nangle, 17th Baron of Navan (died before 1543)
- Patrick Nangle, 18th Baron of Navan (died 1595)
- Thomas Nangle, 19th Baron of Navan (born 1580, died after 1642)
- Patrick Nangle, 20th Baron of Navan (died before 1660)
- George Nangle, 21st Baron of Navan (died 1676)
- John Nangle, 22nd Baron of Navan (born c.1661, died after 1691)
- Patrick Nangle, 23rd Baron of Navan (born c.1690, died c.1757)
- Francis Nangle, 24th Baron of Navan (1720–1781)
