= Cuzick =

Cuzick is a surname. Notable people with the surname include:

- Jack Cuzick (born 1948), American-born British epidemiologist
- Taylor Cuzick (born 1991), American stock car racing driver

== See also ==
- Cusick
