= John Nangle =

John Nangle may refer to:

- John Francis Nangle, American judge
- John Nangle, 16th Baron of Navan, Irish nobleman
