= Timothy Costelloe (disambiguation) =

Timothy Costelloe is an Australian Catholic prelate. Other people with similar names are:

- Tim Costello (born 1955), Australian Baptist minister
- Timothy M. Costelloe (born 1964), American philosopher
- Tim Costello (labor advocate), American labor and anti-globalization advocate
