= Castello (surname) =

Castello or Castelló is a surname. Notable people with the surname include:

- Abraham Isaac Castello (1726–1789), Italian rabbi, preacher and poet, father of Joseph Castello
- Bernardo Castello (1557–1629), Italian Mannerist painter
- Castellino Castello (1580–1649), Italian Baroque painter
- Dan Castello (1836–1909), American showman, animal trainer, clown and circus director
- Dario Castello (1602–1631), Italian composer and violinist
- Eduardo Castelló (1940–2020), Spanish racing cyclist
- Fabrizio Castello (1562–1617), Italian painter of Genoese origin in Spain, son of Givanni Battista Castello
- Félix Castello (1595–1651), Spanish Baroque painter
- Florencio Castelló (1905–1986), Spanish actor in Mexican films
- Francesc de Paula Castelló Aleu (1914–1936), Spanish Roman Catholic beatified martyr
- Giovanni Battista Castello (c. 1500–c. 1579), Italian painter
- Ignazio Paternò Castello, Prince of Biscari (1722–1786), Italian polymath, antiquarian, patron of the arts and Sicilian noble
- John Castello (1802–1877), Guyanese child actor and newspaper publisher and editor
- Joseph Castello (c. 1746–?), Italian Jewish physician
- Julia Castelló (born 1990), Spanish Paralympic swimmer
- Marco Castello (born 1993), Italian singer-songwriter, composer, record producer and multi-instrumentalist
- Marie Castello (1915–2008), American fortune teller and psychic reader
- Núria Castelló (born 1971), Spanish backstroke swimmer
- Pere Martí Castelló (born 1982), Spanish former footballer
- Sandra Castelló (born 1993), Spanish footballer
- Sebastian Castello (soccer) (born 2003), Canadian soccer player
- Sebastian Castellio (1515–1563), also spelled Castello, French theologian
- Valerio Castello (1624–1659), Italian Baroque painter
- Vicente Castelló (c. 1585–1636), Spanish Baroque painter
- Willy Castello (1910–1953), Dutch-American film actor

== See also ==
- Adriano Castellesi (c. 1461-c. 1521), also known as Adriano de Castello or Hadrian de Castello, Italian cardinal, English agent in Rome and writer
- Alberto Bottari de Castello (1942–2025), Italian prelate of the Catholic Church
- Henry, Count of Malta, Enrico da Castello (died c. 1230), Italian fleet captain and corsair
- Guido di Costello, birth name of Pope Celestine II (died 1144)
- Margaret of Castello (1287–1320), Italian Catholic educator and Dominican tertiary nun
- Salvador Espriu i Castelló (1913–1985), Catalan poet
- Santos Abril y Castelló (born 1935), Spanish prelate of the Catholic Church
