= John Nangle, 16th Baron of Navan =

Irish nobleman

John Nangle, 16th Baron of Navan (died 1517) was an Irish nobleman and military commander of the early Tudor era. He was renowned in his own lifetime as a courageous soldier, who fought with distinction at the Battle of Knockdoe in 1504.

== Family ==
He was the son of Thomas Nangle, 15th Baron of Navan: his mother was Ismay Welles, daughter of Sir William Welles, Lord Chancellor of Ireland, and his wife Anne Barnewall. The Nangle (originally named de Angulo) family had come to Ireland around 1172 and became substantial landowners in County Meath, although it has been said that most of them played a "curiously obscure" role in Irish history. The Baron of Navan was a feudal baron: that is, he was entitled to style himself a Baron but he was not a peer and did not have the right to sit in the Irish House of Lords, although the title was in practice hereditary. His father Thomas, then a child, succeeded his much older brother Barnaby, who was killed in a skirmish at Barlaston in 1435. In 1452 he paid the usual fine on attaining his majority and entering on his lands. The date of Thomas's death is uncertain, but John had succeeded to the title by 1487.

== Lambert Simnel ==
Like almost all of the Anglo-Irish nobility, Lord Navan appears to have followed without question the policies pursued by Gerald FitzGerald, 8th Earl of Kildare, who dominated Irish political life between the late 1470s and his death in 1513. Along with nearly all the Irish peers, Lord Navan joined with Kildare in 1487 in declaring that the pretender Lambert Simnel was the rightful King of England. Simnel was crowned in Christ Church Cathedral, Dublin and invaded England with a largely Irish army, but was crushed at the Battle of Stoke Field in June 1487. The victorious King Henry VII showed remarkable clemency to his enemies by pardoning almost all of the surviving rebels, including Navan, as well as Simnel himself, who was given a job in the royal household. In 1488 the English official Sir Richard Edgcumbe accepted Navan's pledge of homage and fealty to King Henry.

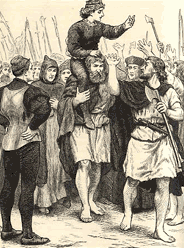
Lambert Simnel in Ireland.

== Battle of Knockdoe ==
Lord Navan remained a loyal supporter of the Earl of Kildare and fought under his command against the Burkes of Clanricarde at the Battle of Knockdoe in 1504. Navan was highly praised for his courage in the fight. According to the account of the battle in the Book of Howth:

MacSweeney struck Great Darcy such a blow that he put Darcy on his knee: that Nangle, Baron of Navan, being a lusty gentleman, that day gave MacSweeney such payment that he was satisfied ever after.

"Great Darcy" was Sir William Darcy (died 1540), a trusted adviser to Kildare, and later a leading statesman in his own right: he is known to have been exceptionally tall. He was a relative of Navan through Navan's mother.

== Marriage and issue ==
Navan died in 1517. A deed of 1518 refers to his widow as having remarried. She was Eleanor, daughter of Sir Thomas Dowdall of Newtown and Termonfeckin, County Louth; her second husband was William Preston, 2nd Viscount Gormanston. Their tomb in the Preston chapel at St. Patrick's Church, Stamullen, County Meath, with their images carved in effigy, still exists, although the church itself has been in a ruinous condition since the seventeenth century. She and Navan had at least 3 children:

- Thomas, 17th Baron of Navan (dead by 1543)
- Elizabeth, who married Christopher Preston, who was a younger son of her stepfather Lord Gormanston by his first wife Anne Burnell, daughter of Sir Robert Burnell of Balgriffin and Margaret Holywood of Artane Castle
- Amy, who married Thomas Fagan of Dublin.
