= Dudley Costello =

Anglo-Irish soldier and journalist (1803–1865)

Dudley Costello (20 July 1803 – 30 September 1865) was an Anglo-Irish soldier, journalist and novelist.

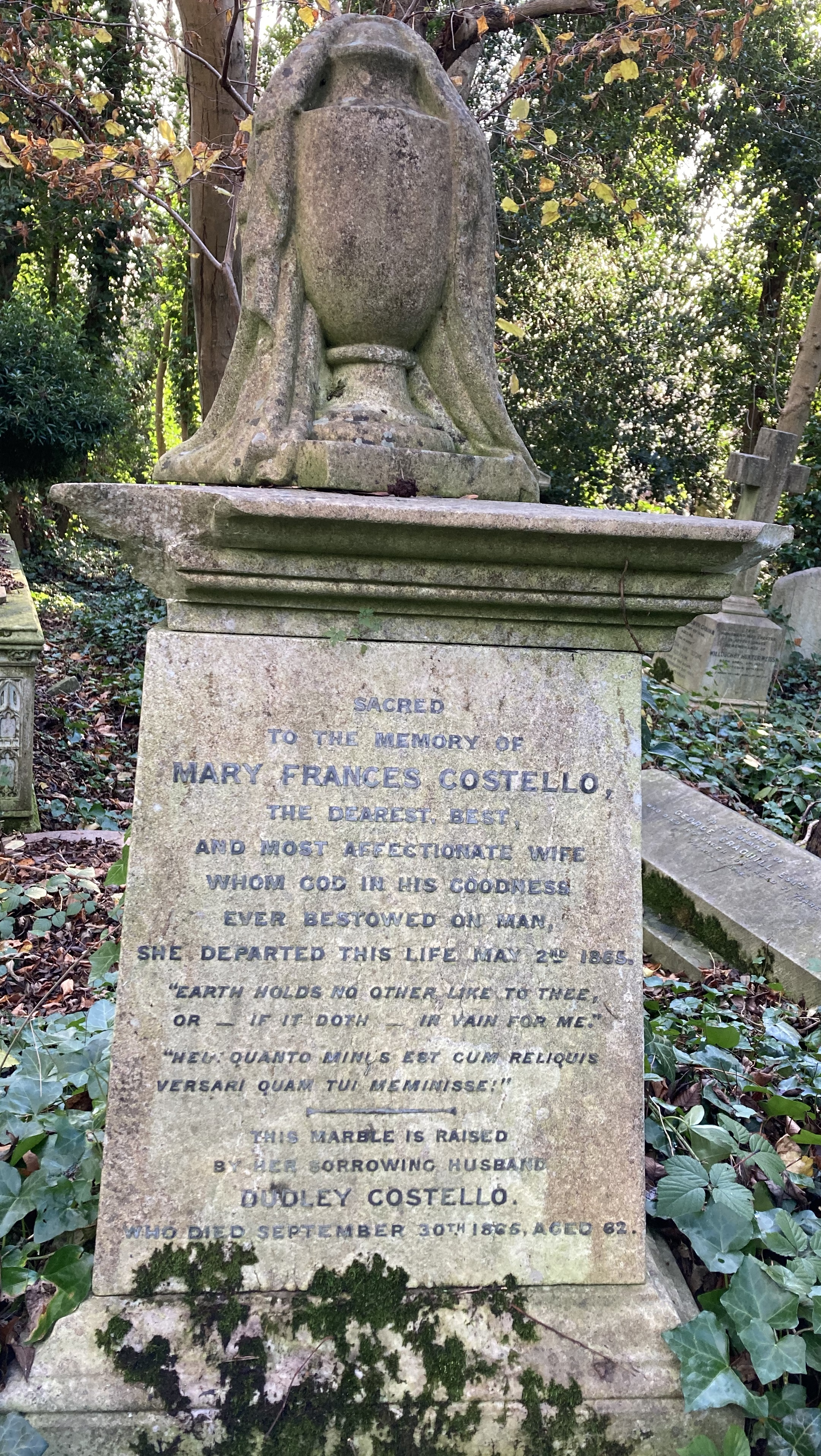
Grave of Dudley Costello in Highgate Cemetery

== Life ==
The son of Colonel J. F. Costello and a namesake and kinsman of Dubhaltach Caoch Mac Coisdealbhaigh, Costello was born in Ireland. He was educated for the army at the Royal Military College, Sandhurst and served for a short time in India, British North America, and the West Indies. He left the army in 1828, and then passed some years in Paris, where he met Baron Cuvier, who employed him as a draughtsman in the preparation of his Règne animal.

Costello next occupied himself in copying illuminated manuscripts in the Bibliothèque Royale, and with his sister Louisa Stuart Costello he helped to revive appreciation of them. About 1838 he became foreign correspondent for the Morning Herald. In 1846 he took the same post at the Daily News, and for the last twenty years of his life he was sub-editor of the Examiner.

His wife, Mary Frances Costello, predeceased him by five months in 1865. They are buried together on the western side of Highgate Cemetery.

== Works ==
As a travel writer, Costello produced A Tour through the Valley of the Meuse (1845) and Piedmont and Italy, from the Alps to the Tiber (1859–1861). Among his works of fiction are Stories from a Screen (18 short stories, 1855), The Millionaire of Mincing Lane (1858), Faint Heart Never Won Fair Lady (1859), and Holidays with Hobgoblins (1860).
