= Kilcashel Stone Fort =

- Coill an Chaisil (Irish)
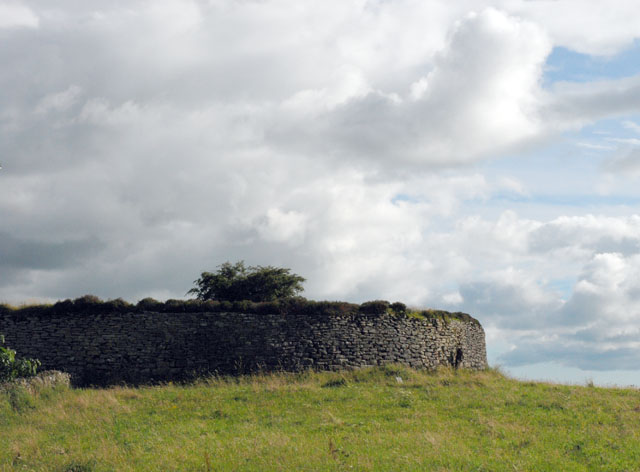

- Location within Ireland
- 53.883434°N 8.680186°W
- Type: stone ringfort (cashel)
- Location: Kilcashel, Kilmovee, County Mayo, Ireland

History
- Built: c. 2500–500 BC

Site notes
- Elevation: 95 m (312 ft)

National monument of Ireland
- Official name: Kilcashel Cashel
- Reference no.: 619

Kilcashel Stone Fort is a double court cairn and National Monument located in County Mayo, Ireland, 800m (½ mile) southeast of Kilmovee. The last surviving member of three stone forts in the area, it's estimated to have been constructed between 2,500 and 500BC.

== Description ==
Kilcashel Stone Fort is 30 m (98 ft) in diameter; the stone wall is 5 m (16 ft) thick and 3 m (9.8 ft) in height. A souterrain is located inside, as well as a bullaun and the sites of two collapsed houses.
