= Irish feudal barony =

Customary title of minor nobility

In Ireland, a feudal barony is a customary title of gentry. The person who holds an Irish feudal barony is always referred to as a baron. However, unlike peers in the British House of Lords, they did not necessarily hold a hereditary peerage title. As a result, feudal barons were not automatically entitled to seats in the Irish House of Lords by virtue of their barony alone. This distinction was noted by the Dublin Government in 1614, which observed that while many "gentlemen" in Ireland were called Baron, "Never was any of them Lord Baron nor summoned to any Parliament". In other words, the title of feudal baron did not in itself confer membership or voting rights in the Irish House of Lords.

== History ==
In Ireland, most of the originally-feudal titular baronies disappeared through obsolescence or disuse. The exception being those feudal baronies with a solid root of title, and those held by Irish or British peers. The Lordship of Fingal was granted to Walter de Lacy, Lord of Meath for seven knight's fees, "although the lords thereof hold elsewhere in capite", according to the unusual grant in 1208 by King John as Lord of Ireland, who allowed de Lacy to retain custody of his fees. Fingal at the time spread from the River Liffey to the River Delvin, north of Dublin, similar to the administrative boundary of today's County Fingal (minus Dublin City) created from part of County Dublin in 1994. A small number of titular feudal baronies continue to exist either as subordinate titles held by members of the Peerage of Ireland, Peerage of Great Britain or the Peerage of the United Kingdom, or as titles held by grand serjeanty, such as, originally, Fingal. Those few feudal baronies that survive all are considered as "incorporeal hereditaments", and may continue to exist as interests or estates in land, registrable as such upon conveyance or inheritance under the Registry of Deeds of the Government of Ireland, or as titles held in gross as personal rights, and not as real interests in land.

Following a 2005 report by the Law Reform Commission, the system of feudal tenure as such, in so far as it had survived, was abolished by the Oireachtas in the Land and Conveyancing Law Reform Act (no. 27 of 2009); fee tail was also abolished. However, estates and interests in land, including incorporeal hereditaments, continue. Formerly registered or proven feudal titles with a solid root of title, and the submerged feudal titles of surviving Irish or British peers were not affected, and continue to exist as personal rights, now held in gross. However, those obsolete or unregistered feudal titles, and those that lapsed into desuetude after 1662, when the Irish Parliament passed the Abolition of Tenures Act, no longer exist as incorporeal hereditaments, nor as personal rights, and cannot be revived.

An example of a hereditary baronial knighthood that remains in Ireland is the Knight of Kerry.

== Current status ==
Some Irish feudal baronial titles have been offered for sale online.

== List ==
List of Irish feudal baronies
Title	Family	Earliest record	First known holder	Ref.
Ards (historically Arde[s] or Art)	Savage (South/Little), Montgomery and Hamilton (North/Great), Hamilton (Middle)	1226-7	Robert de Valibus (Comitatus de Arde established under John de Courcy 1177)	
Ballyvoe	Butler	1614		
Bargy als Slemarge	Purcell, then St. Leger	1298	Walter Purcell	
Birr	Fitzowen	1335	Hugh Fitzowen	
Brownsford	Fitzgerald	1585	David Fitzgerald	
Burnchurch	Fitzmaurice	before 1218	Maurice Fitzmaurice	
Castleknock	Tyrrel	c.1172	Hugh Tyrrel	
Castlemagner	Magner	February 1183 (Castle built); January 10, 1481 (recorded in The Pipe Roll of Cloyne)	William Magunel; David Magnel	
Clabbye	O'Neill	Before 1611	Conn Mac Shane O'Neill	
Dunkellin (historically Doonkillen)	French, then Dorgan	c. 1170	Richard de Clare, Earl of Pembroke (Strongbow)	
Fingal	De Lacy, then Preston, et al.	1208	Walter de Lacy	
Galtrim	Hussey	1374	John Hussey	
Ida	Eyewood then Butler	1358	Sir Piers Butler	
Idrone	le Gros	1175	Raymond Le Gros	
Erris (historically Irrus)	Barrett	Before 1605	Sir Edmund Barrett	
Killetragh	O'Neill	1592	Hugh (mac Conn) Mac Shane O'Neill	
Kells	Fitz-Thomas, then Bermingham	1172	Gilbert Fitz-Thomas	
Kilbixey	Constantine	1172	Geoffrey de Constantine	
Killough [and Rathmollen]	Russell	1316	Thomas Russell	
Loughmoe	Purcell	1328	Richard Purcell	
Lune	Misset	1172	Robert Misset	
Maynooth	Fitzgerald	1172	Maurice Fitzgerald	
Moyashel	Tuite	1172	Risteárd de Tiúit	
Mullingar	Petit	1172	William le Petit	
Naas	Fitzmaurice, then de Londres	1177		
Navan	Nangle	1172	Jocelyn de Angulo	
Newcastle Lyons	Butler	before 1600		
Norragh	St. Michael, then Wellesley	c.1175	Robert St. Michael	
Pormanstowne	Deane	1577		
Rathcormac	Power	before 1597	Piers Power	
Rathdown	MacMillan	1344		
Rathwire	de Lacy, then Daniel	1172	Robert de Lacy	
Skryne	de Feypo, then Marward	1170	Adam de Feypo	

== See also ==
- Barony (Ireland)
- List of baronies of Ireland
- English feudal barony
- Marcher lordship
- Lord
- List of baronies in the peerages of the British Isles

== Sources ==
- A View of the Legal Institutions, Honorary Hereditary Offices, and Feudal Baronies established in Ireland, by William Lynch, Fellow of the Society of Antiquaries, published by Longman, Rees, Orme, Brown, and Green, Paternoster Row, London, 1830.
