= Costello =

Costello may refer to:

== Places ==
- Costello, Northern Territory, Australia
- Costello Athletic Center, a multi-purpose arena in Lowell, Massachusetts, United States
- Costello (barony), County Mayo, Ireland
- Casla (Costelloe in English), a village in County Galway, Ireland

== Music ==
- Costello (band), an American melodic punk/power pop band
- Costello Music, an album by Scottish rock band The Fratellis
- Costello & Nieve, a 1996 live album by Elvis Costello and Steve Nieve
- Costello (Finnish band), Finnish musical band fronted by Costello Hautamäki

== Others ==
- 17024 Costello (1999 EJ5), main-belt asteroid
- Costello (surname)
  - Lou Costello (1906–1959), Italian-American actor and comedian, of Abbott and Costello
- Costello (TV series), American television sitcom
- Costello Hautamäki (born 1963), Finnish singer and musician

== See also ==
- Costel, a Romanian male given name
- Costello's, a former Irish restaurant and bar in New York City
