= Tomás Láidir Mac Coisdealbhaigh =

17th-century Irish poet and soldier

Tomás Láidir Mac Coisdealbhaigh was a Irish soldier and poet who flourished in the 1660s.

Tomás Láidir Mac Coisdealbhaigh was a member of the Costello family of north Connacht who lost their lands in the Cromwellian confiscations of the 1650s. He was a descendant of Sir William de Angulo, who died in 1206. His brother was the Rapparee, Colonel Dubhaltach Caoch Mac Coisdealbhaigh.

== Biography ==
Mac Coisdealbhaigh was in love with Úna Ní Dhiarmaida but her family refused to allow them to marry. After several attempts, Mac Coisdealbhaigh made a last formal proposal, swearing that if he crossed Áth na Donóige (a ford on the Donóige river) on his way home without receiving an answer, he would never marry Úna. "He rode slowly and waited a long time in the ford itself, but finally on the mocking advice of his own servant, he crossed to the opposite bank. A messenger came soon after with news that he had been accepted, but he refused to go back on his oath. Úna died shortly afterward. Tomás killed the servant who gave him the evil counsel, and composed the famous song Úna Bhán."

== Clann Coisdealbhaigh (after Mac Fhirbhisigh) ==
Jocelyn de Angulo, fl. 1172
    |
    |
William de Angulo, aka William Mac Coisdealbhaigh
    |
    |
Miles Bregach Mac Coisdealbhaigh
    |
    |-------------------+------------------------+
    |                   |                        |
    |                   |                        |
Hugo, died 1266?    Gilbert Mor              Phillip, fl. 1288.
    |                   |                        |
    |                   |                        |--------------+
Jordan, died 1324?  Gilbert Og, k. 1333          |              |
    |                   |                        |              |
    |                   |                   Jordan Duff    Baldraithe/Baldrin
  John              John, fl. 1366               |              |
                        |                Mac Jordan Duff    Mac Phillip
                        |
                    Jordan na Bertaighecht
                        |
     +------------------+------------+
     |                               |
 Edmond an Machaire, k. 1437      William
     |
     |----------------------------------------------------------------------------------------------------+
     |                               |                                                                    |
 John Duff, died 1487             William                                                              Walter
     |                               |                                                                    |
     |                               |------------------+---------------------+               +-----------+------+
 Gilleduff                           |                  |                     |               |                  |
     |                               |                  |                     |               |                  |
     |--------------+            Walter, k. 1545    John Dubh, fl. 1536.  Jordan Glegil    Hubert              John
     |              |                |                  |                     |               |                  |
     |              |                |                  |                     |               |                  |---------+
 Jordan         John, k. 1536    Rudhraighe         Piers, k. 1555         William        Gilladuff              |         |
     |              |                                   |                     |               |                  |         |
     |              |                                   |                     |               |-----+-----+   Thomas   Jordan Boy
 Jordan Buidhe   Jordan                                William               David            |     |     |      |         |
     |              |                                     |                   |               |     |     |      |         |
     |              |------+---------------+     +--------|          +--------+----------+  Edmond John  Walter David   Dubhaltach
  Edmond            |      |               |     |        |          |        |          |        fl. 1586                |
                    |      |               |     David    Richard    |        |          |                                |
                  John   Jordan Buidhe   William Caech             Edmond   William  Calvach                   Jordan Boy, fl. 1585
                                             k. 1589                                                                      |
             +----------------------------------------------------+-------------------------+-----------------------------|
             |                                                    |                         |                             |
    Tomás Láidir Mac Coisdealbhaigh         Dubhaltach Caoch Mac Coisdealbhaigh         Edmond Dubh                Calbhach Ban
            fl. 1660s                           killed 3 March 1667

== Sources ==
- pp. 174–175; 400 The New Oxford Book of Irish Verse, edited, with translations, by Thomas Kinsella, 1986.
