= Skreen (barony) =

Barony in County Meath, Ireland

Skreen An Scrín (Irish)
- Barony
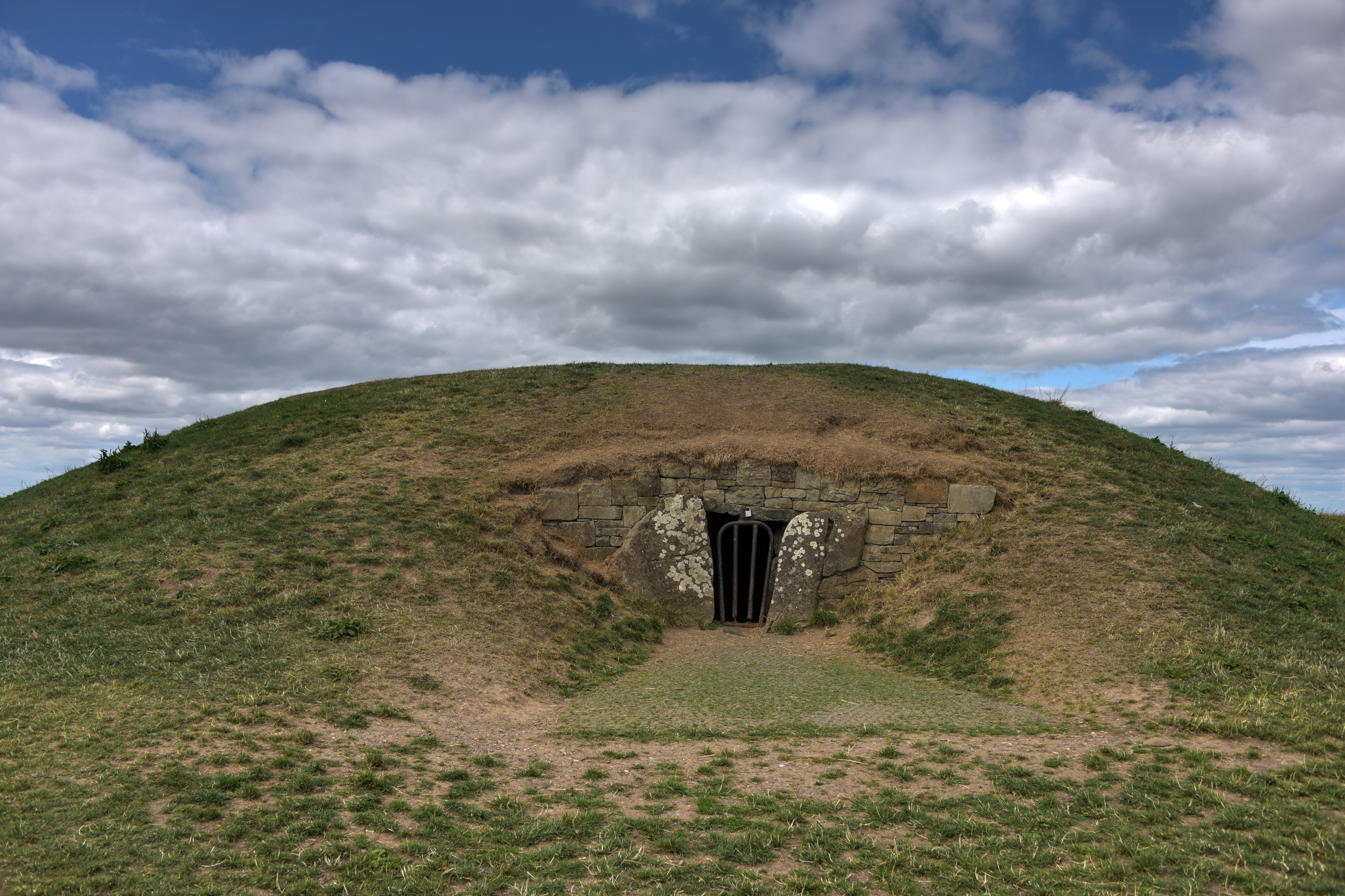
- Mound of the Hostages, Hill of Tara

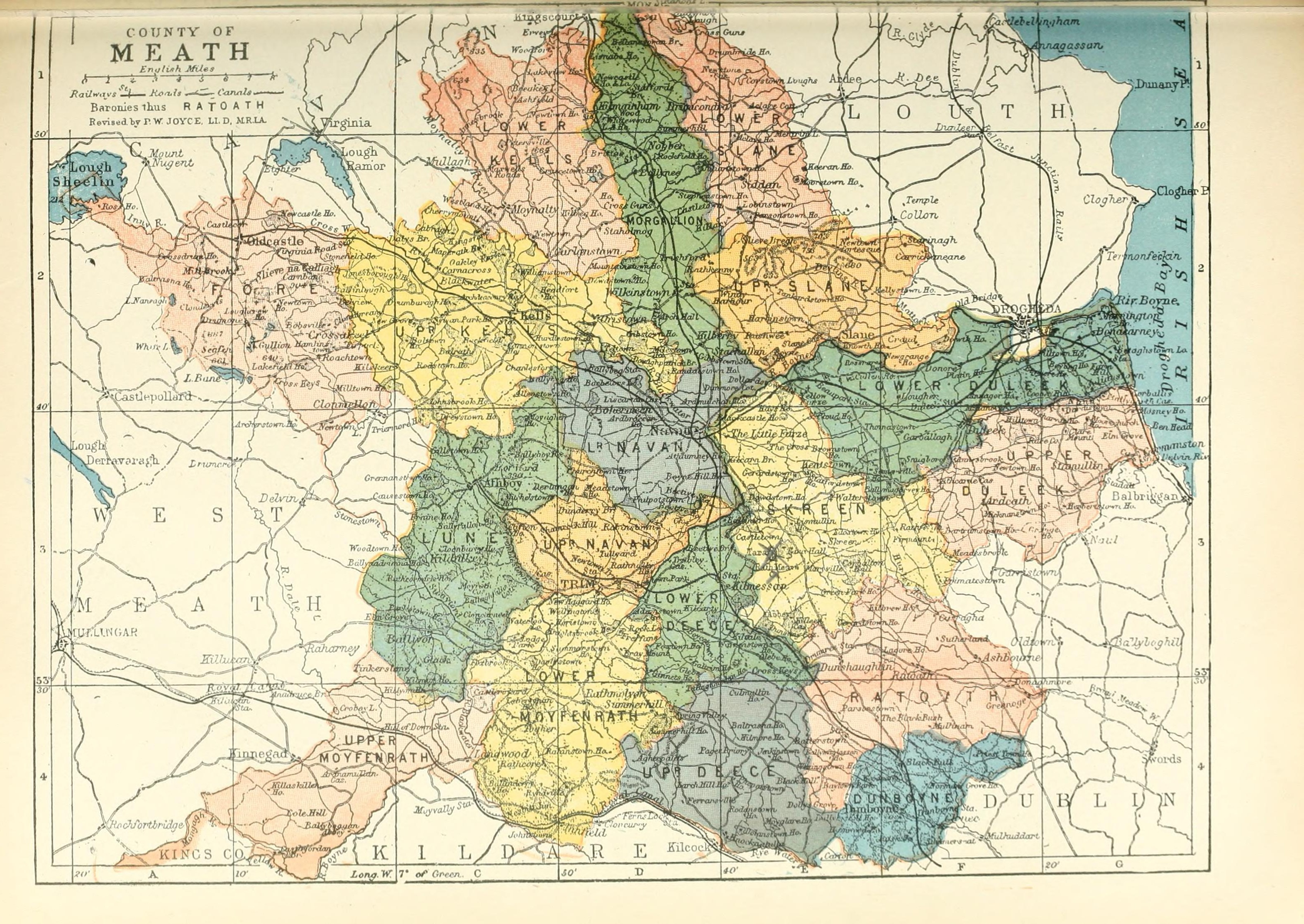
- Barony map of County Meath, 1900; Skreen is in the middle, coloured yellow.

- Location within Ireland
- Coordinates: 53°35′N 6°32′W
- Sovereign state: Ireland
- Province: Leinster
- County: Meath

Area
  - Total: 165.5 km^{2} (63.9 sq mi)

Skreen (Irish: An Scrín, also spelled Skryne) is a historical barony in central County Meath, Ireland.

Baronies were mainly cadastral rather than administrative units. They acquired modest local taxation and spending functions in the 19th century before being superseded by the Local Government (Ireland) Act 1898.

== History ==
The barony was formed from the territory of Magh Breagh (Brega), which was ruled by the Ua Duinn (Dunnes). The Irish feudal barony of Baron Skryne (named for the settlement of Skryne) was granted to Adam de Feypo after the Norman invasion.

== Geography ==
Skreen is in the middle of the county, to the east of the River Boyne. It contains the Hill of Tara, and both Dunsany and Killeen Castles.

== List of settlements ==
Settlements within the historical barony of Skreen include:

- Navan (easternmost part)
- Skryne
