= Skryne Castle =

Irish ruined castle

Coordinates: 53.5829°N 6.5615°W

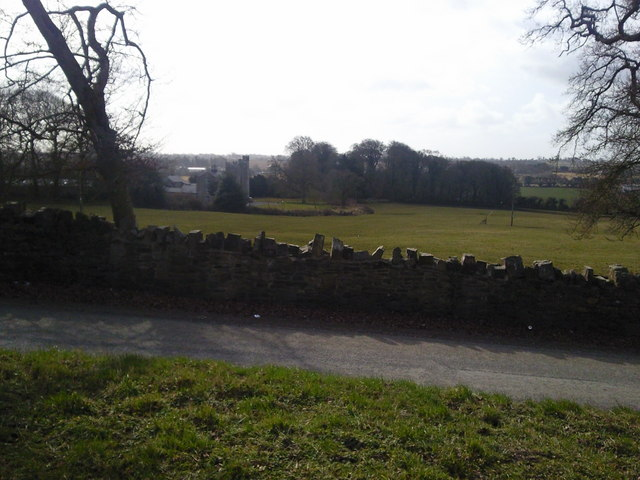
Skryne Castle

Skryne Castle (Irish: Caislean na Scríne or Caisleán Scrín Cholm Cille) was a castle at Skryne, County Meath, Ireland; only ruins remain. The motte and bailey castle was built by Adam de Feypo in the 12th century.
