= Kilmovee =

Kilmovee Cill Mobhí
- Village
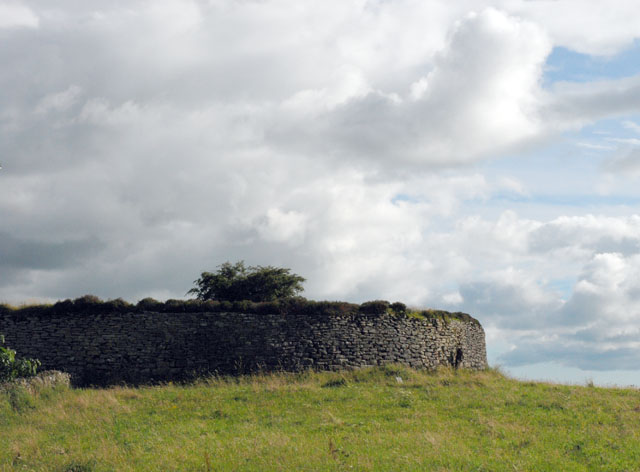
- Cashel ring fort at Kilmovee

- Location in Ireland
- Coordinates: 53°53′13″N 8°41′16″W
- Country: Ireland
- Province: Connacht
- County: County Mayo
- Elevation: 56 m (184 ft)

Population (2002)
  - Total: 613
- Urlaur: 523; Kilkelly: 839
- Time zone: UTC+0 (WET)
  - Summer (DST): UTC-1 (IST (WEST))
- Irish Grid Reference: M545936
- Website: kilmovee.info

Kilmovee (Irish: Cill Mobhí, meaning 'Church of Mobhí') is a village and civil parish in County Mayo, Ireland. It is a mainly rural parish on the R325 road, midway between Kilkelly and Ballaghaderreen.

In March 2004, the Cois Tine Heritage Centre was opened and since then it has become a cultural centre for the people of the area. In 2011, the Annual Seosamh Mac Gabhann Summer School was established in Kilmovee to honour the Irish language playwright and music teacher Seosamh Mac Gabhann, who lived and worked in Kilmovee for much of his life.

== History ==
In pre-Norman Ireland, the lands of Kilmovee formed part of the Kingdom of Sliabh Lugha, a territory ruled by the O'Gadhra Dynasty. Sliabh Lugha was a subdivision of the larger Gailenga kingdom, from which derives the modern name Gallen.

After the Norman Invasion, the parish of Kilmovee became part of the Barony of Costello. The Nangle or de Angelo invaders came southwest from the De Lacy territory in Carrick-on-Shannon and forced the O'Gadhras from their stronghold in Airtech Mór, building their own castle there in 1225. It became known as Castlemore and the region was sometimes called Castlemore-MacCostello.

Coolavin - The sept of O'Gara were given as Lord of Cuil Obh-Finn (Prince of Coolavin) and of Sliabh Lugha which was part of the Barony of Costello in Co. Mayo, where they had spread in the 13th century. O'Gara was seated at Moygara castle. By the 13th century the MacDermots became lords of Coolavin.

— Ireland's History in Maps

The Annals of Connacht mention a skirmish which took place in Clooncara, Kilmovee in 1464:

1464.51

An attack was made by Muirgius son of Cormac Mac Diarmata Gall, at Cluain Carthaig in Sliab Luga, on Edmund of the Plain Mac Goisdelb, wherein Tomaltach Oc O Gadra was killed with one cast of a javelin.

— Annals of Connacht The Miscellany of the Irish Archaeological Society. Vol. 1

Samuel Lewis's Topographical Dictionary of Ireland, published in 1837, gives the following account of Kilmovee:

KILMOVEE, a parish, in the Barony of Costello, County Mayo, and province of Connacht, 5 miles (W. by N.) from Ballaghadereen, on the road to Castlebar; containing 4240 inhabitants. It comprises 19,668 statute acres, as applotted under the tithe act, including 8500 acres of bog, and the remainder is very barren and mountainous.
It is a vicarage, in the diocese of Achonry, forming part of the union of Castlemore; the rectory is impropriate in Viscount Dillon. The tithes amount to £200. 8. 10., which is equally divided between the impropriator and the vicar. The R. C. parish is co-extensive with that of the Established Church, and has chapels at Kilmovee and Glen. About 330 children are educated in four private schools. There are some remains of the old church in a burial-ground.

— Library Ireland

=== Archaeological sites ===
An ogham stone found in a wall in Kilmovee is now mounted beside "The Three Wells." "The Three Wells" are reputed to have sprung up when St. Mobhi struck the ground with his staff when he had no water to baptise the local people.

According to the Celtic Inscribed Stones Project the inscription is somewhat damaged but the legible part reads: "ALATTOS MAQI BR"[--.

The parish of Kilmovee has several Iron Age stone forts in various states, including Kilcashel Stone Fort.

=== Built heritage ===
The Glebe

The residence of the Protestant Rector for Ballaghaderreen. When the French army was marching east from Killala to Longford, the battalion came through Kilmovee to cross the River Lung. Local farmers joined the battalion to fight off the enemy. When the battalion was defeated, the local farmers’ lands were confiscated and given to the Protestant Church.

Church of Mobhí

Kilmovee is known in Irish as Cill Mobhí (Church of Mobhí). Mobhí (Irish pronunciation: [mˠəˈvʲiː]) was known as "Mobhí the Teacher" and is believed to have died in 544 AD. The name Mobhí is a pet form of the name Berchán. A pestilence which devastated Ireland in 544 caused the dispersion of Mobhi's disciples, and Columba returned to Ulster.

Old RIC Barrack

According to the 1901 Census of the United Kingdom there were three Royal Irish Constabulary barracks in the parish of Kilmovee; one in Kilkelly, one at Rathnagussaun and one at Sraheens. The Barracks at Sraheens is still standing though now derelict. During the War of Independence, in June 1921, the RIC barracks at Sraheens was subjected to sniper fire from the Kilkelly Company of the East Mayo IRA under the command of Mick Moffett. One Black and Tans soldier was wounded during the operation and as a result the barracks was abandoned.

=== 20th century ===
In 1975, Kilmovee teacher Seosamh Mac Gabhann set up a Senior Céilí Band in Kilmovee, named Ceoltóirí Mobhí. The band gained recognition with two of their jigs, known as "The Kilmovee Jigs". In 1977 one of the first rural swimming pools in Ireland was opened in Kilmovee.

== Sport ==
An annual charity running event, the Kilmovee 10K began in April 2010. It has been called "the flattest 10k in Ireland" and has attracted runners from all over the country.

Kilmovee Shamrocks is the local GAA club. The Shamrocks have competed in county and regional competitions. Some of these club's Ladies' Gaelic football players have won All-Ireland titles with the Mayo senior and minor teams and at other levels. Kilmovee GAA won the under-21 Mayo final in September 2007 for the first time. The Shamrocks also won the Under 18 title for the third time in a row in October 2007.

== Townlands ==
Townlands in the area include:

Name in English	Name in Irish	Translation
Aughadeffin	Achadh Doiffin	Divin's field
Ballinrumpa	Baile an Rumpa	town of the rupture or rump
Ballyglass	Baile Glas	green village
Barcul	Barr Cuill	top of the hazel
Carrowbeg	Ceathrú Bheag	the little quarter
Carrownalacka	Ceathrú an Leaca	quarter of the hillside
Cashellahenny	Caiseal Laithinne	Lahinny's stone fort
Clooncara	Cluain Cártha	lawn or meadow of the rock
Cloonfaulis	Cluain Falas	bright meadow
Cloonfeaghra	Cluain Fiachra	Fiachra's lawn or meadow
Clooniron	Cluain Iarrainn	meadow of the iron
Cloonnamna	Cluain na Mná	the woman's lawn or meadow
Culgarriff	Cor Garbh	coarse round hill (Cor also denotes a pit)
Culcastle	Coill an Chaisil	wood of the fort
Culclare	Coill a' Chláir	wood of the plain
Culiagh	Coilleadh	woodland
Derragh	Doire Each	the oakwood of the horses
Derrynaleck	Doire na Leice	oakwood of the flat stone
Glantavraun	Gleann Tabhráin	Tavran's Glen
Gowlaun	Gabhlán	a small fork
Kilkelly	Cill Cheallaigh	Ceallach's church
Kilmore	Coill Mhór	great wood
Kilmovee	Cill Mobhi	St Mobhi's church
Knockbrack	Cnoc Breac	speckled hill
Leveelick	Leath-Mhíliuc	the marshy half
Magheraboy	Machaire Buí	yellow plain
Raherolish	Rath ar Eolais	Eolus' Fort
Rathnagussaun	Rath na nGiosán	fort of the pikes
Rusheens East	Ruisíní	small point of land, or small woods
Rusheens West	Ruisíní	small point of land, or small woods
Shammerbawn	Seamair Bán	white sorrel, or shamrock
Shammerdoo	Seamair Dubh	black sorrel, or shamrock
Skeheen	Sceithín	a small bush or lone thorn
Sinolane	Sonnach-mhulláin	mound or rampart of the hill
Sraheens	Sraithíní	small holms
Tavrane	Teamhrán	a little hill commanding fine prospect
Tullyganny	Tulach Gainimh	hill of the sand
Egool	Accomhal	Old Irish, meaning a junction or connecting piece of Land
Urlaur	Urlár	a floor
