= Mark Costello =

Mark Costello may refer to:

- Mark Costello (author), American author
- Mark Costello (Iowa politician) (born 1961), Iowa state legislator
- Mark Costello (Oklahoma politician) (1955–2015), Oklahoma Labor Commissioner
