= Dubhaltach Caoch Mac Coisdealbhaigh =

- Born: c. 1600
- Died: 3 March 1667 (aged 66–67); Coolcarney, Bonniconlon, County Mayo, Ireland
- Relatives: Tomás Láidir Mac Coisdealbhaigh (brother)
- Military career
- Allegiance: Confederate Ireland; Spanish Empire
- Branch: Connacht Army; Spanish Royal Army
- Rank: Colonel
- Conflicts: Irish Confederate Wars

Colonel Dubhaltach Caoch Mac Coisdealbhaigh, Irish soldier and Rapparee, died on Sunday 3 March 1667.

== Life ==
Mac Coisdealbhaigh was a member of the Costello family of Connacht. His brother was the soldier and poet, Tomás Láidir Mac Coisdealbhaigh.

Dudley (or Dubhaltach) Costello was an officer in the army of the Confederate Catholics in 1642, and later became a colonel in the Spanish Royal Army. Returning to Ireland after the Restoration and disappointed by his failure to recover the family estates, he devoted the rest of his life to wreaking vengeance on the new Hiberno-Norman Dillon landlords. Proclaimed a tory and a rebel in the summer of 1666, Mac Coisdealbhaigh "carried out a vendetta of raids and burnings against Viscount Dillon in the baronies of Costello and Gallen, in east Mayo, until he was shot dead by the soldiers of Captain Theobald Dillon at Coolcarney in Bunnyconnellan, early in March 1667." (p. 236). His head was hung from the St. James Gate in Dublin, today the home of Guinness.

He is featured in Dubhaltach Mac Fhirbhisigh's Leabhar na nGenealach at 827.2, as Dubhaltach Caoch, and in his Cuimre (1416.1) as Dubhaltach Colonel, mac Suirtain Buidhe Mec Goisdelbh.

A 19th-century namesake and kinsman was Dudley Costello.

== Clann Coisdealbhaigh (after Mac Fhirbhisigh) ==
  Jocelyn de Angulo, fl. 1172.
  |
  |
  William de Angulo, aka William Mac Coisdealbhaigh
  |
  |
  Miles Bregach Mac Coisdealbhaigh
  |
  |______________________________________________
  |                   |                        |
  |                   |                        |
  Hugo, d. 1266?      Gilbert Mor              Phillip, fl. 1288.
  |                   |                        |
  |                   |                        |____________________________
  Jordan, d. 1324?    Gilbert Og, k. 1333.     |              |
  |                   |                        |              |
  |                   |                        Jordan Duff    Baldraithe/Baldrin
  John.               John, fl. 1366.          |              |
                      |                    Mac Jordan Duff    Mac Phillip
                      |
                      Jordan na Bertaighecht
                      |
   ___________________|_____________
   |                               |
   |                               |
   Edmond an Machaire, k. 1437.    William
   |
   |_________________________________________________________________________________________________________________
   |                                   |                                                                            |
   |                                   |                                                                            |
   John Duff, d. 1487.                 William                                                                    Walter
   |                                   |                                                                            |
   |                                   |_________________________________________               ____________________|
   Gilleduff                           |                  |                     |               |                 |
   |                                   |                  |                     |               |                 |
   |_________________                  Walter, k. 1545    John Dubh, fl. 1536.  Jordan Glegil   Hubert            John
   |                |                  |                  |                     |               |                 |
   |                |                  |                  |                     |               |                 |___________
   Jordan           John, k. 1536      Rudhraighe         Piers, k. 1555.       William     Gilladuff             |         |
   |                |                                     |                     |               |                 |         |
   |                |                                     |                     |               |____________    Thomas     Jordan Boy
   Jordan Buidhe    Jordan                                William               David           |     |     |      |        |
   |                |                                     |                     |               |     |     |      |        |
   |                |_______________________     _________|            _________|____________  Edmond John  Walter David  Dubhaltach
   Edmond           |      |               |     |        |            |        |           |        fl. 1586.              |
                    |      |               |     David    Richard      |        |           |                               |
                    John   Jordan Buidhe   William Caech               Edmond   William   Calvach                   Jordan Boy, fl. 1585
                                             k. 1589                                                                        |
   _________________________________________________________________________________________________________________________|
   |                                                      |                           |                                     |
   |                                                      |                           |                                     |
  Tomás Láidir Mac Coisdealbhaigh  Dubhaltach Caoch Mac Coisdealbhaigh                Edmond Dubh                    Calbhach Ban
      fl. 1660s.                         killed 3 March 1667.
