= Cusack Roney =

Irish surgeon (1781–1849)

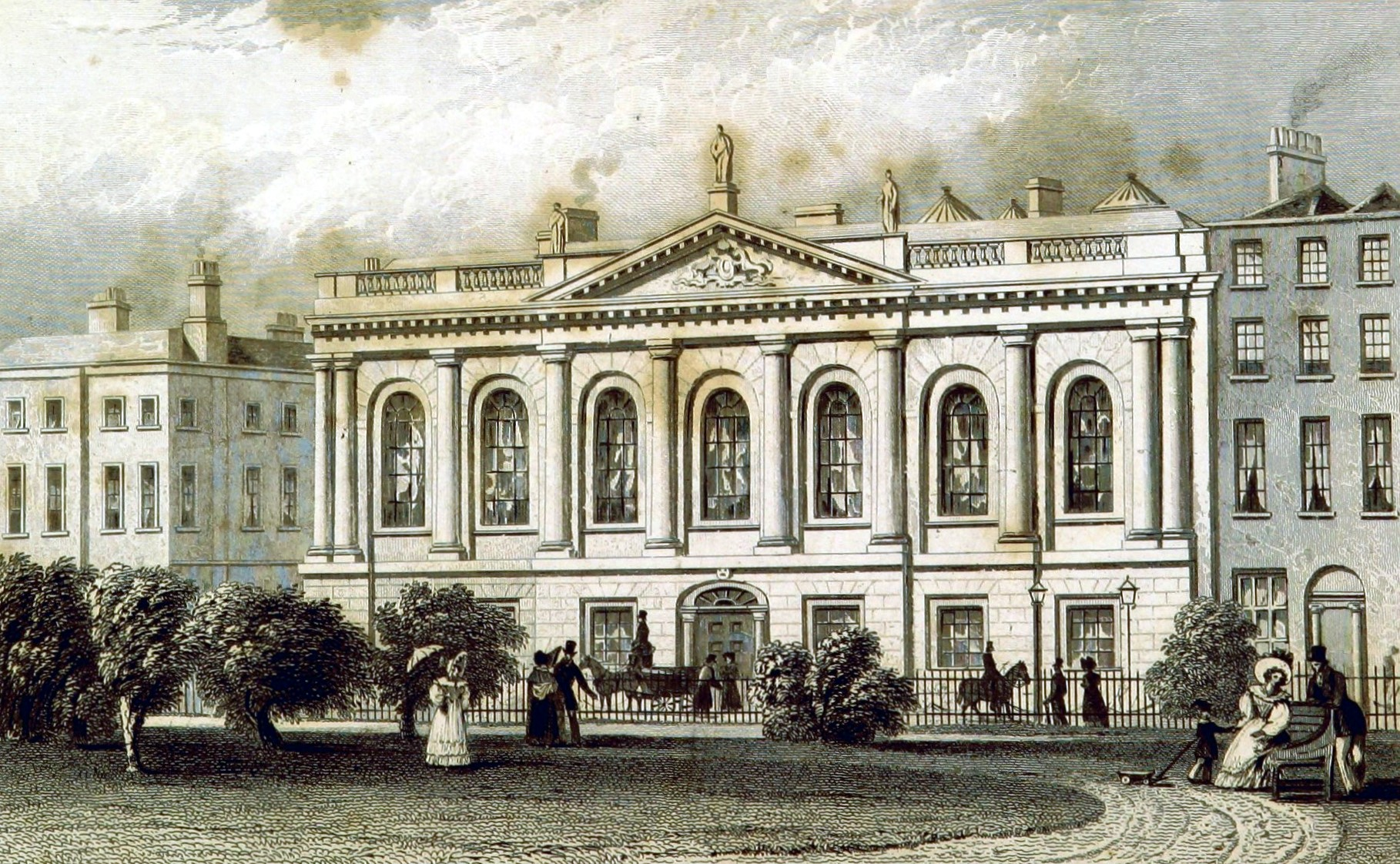
"The College of Surgeons, Dublin". 1837.

Patrick Cusack Roney or Rooney (bapt. 2 April 1781 – 26 August 1849) was an Irish medical doctor who was President of the Royal College of Surgeons in Ireland (RCSI) in 1814 and 1828.

He was indentured to his surgeon father, Cusick Roney in 1795, and studied professionally in the Royal College of Surgeons in Ireland, where he obtained his Licentiate and subsequently elected a Member of RCSI in 1803. In 1802 Roney succeeded George O'Brien as Surgeon to the Meath Hospital, and retained that position until his death. He was also a Surgeon at Kilmainham Prison. At first, he resided in Dominick Street, and in about 1824 changed his residence to York Street.

He speculated largely in stocks, and lost heavily. This misfortune obliged him to leave Dublin, and he resided with one of his sons in London for several years. He returned to Dublin, and died of Asiatic cholera on 26 August 1849, at Mountpleasant-square, and was buried in St. Catherine's Churchyard, James's-street. Roney had married Charlotte Mulley in 1804. Their son was the railway executive Sir Cusack Patrick Roney (1809–1868).

== Arms ==
Coat of arms of Cusack Roney

Notes
Granted 5 January 1856 by Sir John Bernard Burke, Ulster King of Arms.
Crest
An arm in armour embowed grasping a sword all Proper charged with a mullet and crescent in pale Gules.
Torse
Of the colours.
Escutcheon
Quarterly Or and Argent in the first and fourth quarters a mullet Gules and in the second and third a crescent Sable over all a lion rampant Azure.
Motto
Audaces Fortuna Juvat

== See also ==
- List of presidents of the Royal College of Surgeons in Ireland
