= Nigel Costello =

English footballer

Personal information
- Full name: Nigel Graham Costello
- Date of birth: 22 November 1968 (age 57)
- Place of birth: Catterick, Yorkshire, England
- Position: Winger

Youth career
- 1985–1987: York City

Senior career*
Years	Team	Apps	(Gls)
1987–1988	York City	4	(0)
- York Railway Institute
- Bridlington Town
- Pontefract Collieries
- Nestlé Rowntree
1993–????	Selby Town		
Total		4+	(0+)
- * Club domestic league appearances and goals

Nigel Graham Costello (born 22 November 1968) is an English former professional footballer who played as a winger in the Football League for York City, and in non-League football for York Railway Institute, Bridlington Town, Pontefract Collieries, Nestlé Rowntree and Selby Town.
