= Peter Costello (disambiguation) =

Peter Costello (born 1957) is a former politician who served as Australian Treasurer from 1996 to 2007.

Peter Costello may also refer to:

- Peter E. Costello (1854–1935), American politician
- Peter Costello (author) (born 1946), Irish historian and biographer
- Peter Costello (footballer) (born 1969), English footballer
