= Cusack Patrick Roney =

Irish civil servant (1809–1868)

Sir Cusack Patrick Roney
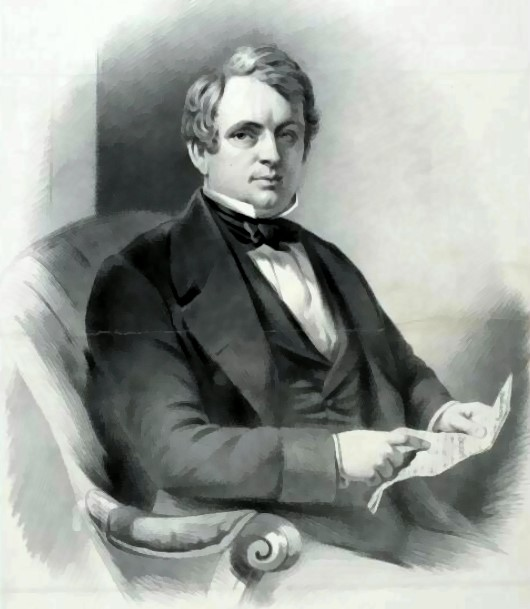
- Lithograph by W. Underwood after a drawing by Frederick Gush
- Born: 1809; Dublin, Ireland
- Died: 30 September 1868 (aged 58–59); London, England
- Education: Trinity College Dublin
- Occupations: Writer, company secretary, director
- Board member of: Grand Trunk Railway Company of Canada

Sir Cusack Patrick Roney (baptised February 1809 – 30 September 1868) was an Irish civil servant who was a private secretary in the British Civil Service. He is most associated with the railway industry, being secretary to two railway companies and managing director of the Grand Trunk Railway Company of Canada. He was knighted for his role as secretary to the Great Industrial Exhibition held in Dublin in 1853.

== Early life and family ==
Cusack Roney was born in Dublin around 1809, the son of Cusack Roney, who was twice president of the Royal College of Surgeons in Ireland (RCSI), and his wife, Charlotte. He was educated in Paris and at Trinity College Dublin. He was admitted to Trinity College on 20 October 1823, aged 14½. He received his BA in 1829. He qualified as a surgeon with the RCSI but did not pursue a medical career.

He married Elizabeth Anne Whitcombe in 1807. She died in 1861. They had a son, Cusack Willes Roney.

== Career ==
Roney's early career was as a writer in London for The Athenaeum and other periodicals. He then had a succession of administrative jobs. He was secretary of the Royal Literary Fund from 1835 to 1837, manager at the Polytechnic Institution from 1839 or 1840, and private secretary to Richard More O'Ferrall when he was secretary to the Admiralty. He was then a clerk at the Admiralty.

Roney's first railway appointment was as secretary to the Cambridge and Lincoln Railway Company in 1845. He was also secretary of the Eastern Counties Railway. He became managing director of the Grand Trunk Railway Company of Canada in 1853, whose corporate headquarters was in London. In 1855 he prepared a report with A. M. Ross and S. P. Bidder for the board of directors on the prospects for the Grand Trunk railway in Canada, concluding that it "cannot fail to prove a highly profitable enterprize".

In 1853, he was knighted by Edward Eliot, 3rd Earl of St Germans for his role as secretary to the Great Industrial Exhibition, held that year in Dublin.

In 1863–64, he was involved in a legal case relating to shares in The Llanharry Hematite Iron Ore Company Limited of which he was a director.

== Death ==
In 1868, Roney published Rambles on Railways, the publication of which was delayed by his serious illness. In the Preface, Roney stated that he had enough material for a further volume, mainly on foreign railways, that he expected to be published later the same year but it never was and he died on 30 September 1868 at Cleveland Square, in the Bayswater district of London.

== Arms ==
Coat of arms of Cusack Patrick Roney

Notes
Granted 5 January 1856 by Sir John Bernard Burke, Ulster King of Arms.
Crest
An arm in armour embowed grasping a sword all Proper charged with a mullet and crescent in pale Gules.
Torse
Of the colours.
Escutcheon
Quarterly Or and Argent in the first and fourth quarters a mullet Gules and in the second and third a crescent Sable over all a lion rampant Azure.
Motto
Audaces Fortuna Juvat

== Selected publications ==
- Reports of Sir Cusack P. Roney; Mr. A. M. Ross; Mr. S. P. Bidder; to the London Board of Directors. John Thomas Norris, London, for the Grand Trunk Railway Company of Canada, 1855.
- How to Spend a Month in Ireland and What it Will Cost. W. Smith and Sons, London, 1861.
- The Alps and the Eastern Mails. London, 1867.
- Rambles on Railways. With Maps, Diagrams, and Appendices. Effingham Wilson, London, 1868.
