= Joseph Castello =

Italian physician

Joseph Castello (or Joseph Castilho) (born ca. 1746 in Livorno, Italy) was an Italian Jewish physician, and son of Rabbi Abraham Isaac Castello. After studying medicine at Pisa, he returned to his native city, where he soon acquired a reputation as a physician. A medical work written by Castello and dedicated to the archduke (afterward Emperor Leopold II), did not appear until after his death, which occurred while he was still in the prime of manhood. Castello's brother Samuel was an eminent physician at Leghorn, and his son Abraham Isaac was a lawyer and poet in the same city.

== Bibliography ==
- Piperno, A.B., Qol 'Ugab, Leghorn, 1846
