= Edward Costello =

- Born: Edward Joseph Costello; 13 October 1888; Kilcock, County Kildare, Ireland
- Died: 25 April 1916 (aged 27); Jervis Street Hospital, Dublin, Ireland
- Burial place: Glasnevin Cemetery
- Military career
- Allegiance: Irish Republic
- Branch: Irish Volunteers
- Service years: 1915–1916
- Unit: 1st Dublin Battalion
- Known for: Participation in the 1916 Easter Rising
- Conflicts: Easter Rising

Edward Joseph Costello (13 October 1888 – 25 April 1916) was one of two people from the geographical area now known as Northern Ireland to be killed in the 1916 Easter Rising in Ireland.

== Biography ==
Costello was born in Kilcock, County Kildare to James (snr) and Anne Costello (née Reynolds). His parents came from Lurgan, County Armagh, and moved to Kilcock to work in a family business which was in the town centre.

Costello moved to Lurgan in 1912 and worked as a clerk in Johnston and Allen's Linen Manufacturers on Victoria Street. He married Annie Loughlin and lived in number 3 Castle Lane Lurgan. In 1914, following the deterioration of his marriage, he moved to the Kingstown suburb of Dublin to work as a clerk in Boland's Bakery. His death certificate lists his final occupation as a pawnbroker's assistant.

Costello joined the 1st Dublin Battalion of the Irish Volunteers in 1915. His wife Annie remained in Lurgan. He made frequent visits back to the town to see his wife and children.

Costello took part in the Easter Rising in April 1916. He was initially part of the forces that attacked the Magazine Fort in the Phoenix Park. Later, he joined the volunteers who had taken control of the Four Courts. On 25 April, he received a fatal bullet wound to the head while fighting at Church Street, and died upon arriving at Jervis Street Hospital. He was aged 27 years. His brother James published an advertisement in the Evening Gazette on 7 June seeking information on his whereabouts. James later registered the death on 15 June, and Edward was buried in Glasnevin Cemetery on 1 May 1916. His grave is in the St, Paul's section, DC 30. At present there is no headstone on his grave.

Costello's widow remained in Lurgan and raised his children in the town. They moved from Castle Lane in the 1950s, moving to number 1 Antrim Road, Lurgan. His widow Annie Costello died in Lurgan on 22 March 1959.

In 2016 there was controversy in Lurgan about the building of a memorial to him.
