= Louisa Stuart Costello =

British miniature painter and author

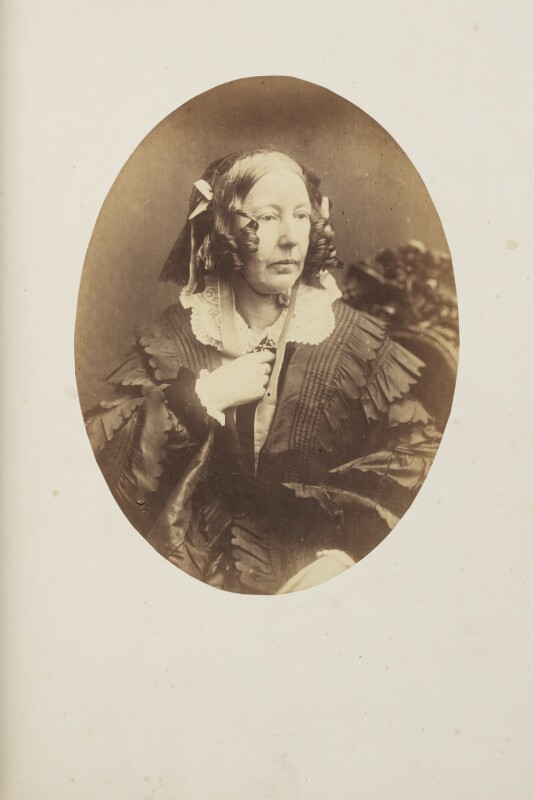
- Born: 9 October 1799
- Died: 24 April 1870; Boulogne-sur-Mer (Second French Empire)
- Occupation: Writer
- Relatives: Dudley Costello

Louisa Stuart Costello (9 October 1799 – 24 April 1870) was an Anglo-Irish author on travel and French history, said to have been born either in Ireland or Sussex. After having obtained a living at a young age as a painter to financially support her mother and brother, she went on to write an extensive corpus of articles, poetry, songs, novels and nonfictional books, including Memoirs of Eminent Englishwomen and The Maid of the Cyprus Isle, the former of which she herself illustrated. The Rose Garden of Persia, her compilation of Persian poetry, was reissued thrice in the decades after her death in 1870. She travelled extensively and was, in her day, a popular travel writer.

== Life and work ==
Costello lived in Paris, France, near the River Seine (according to her death certificate). She had no true home, but went from place to place staying with friends and acquaintances. She and her brother Dudley Costello, also well known for travel writing, promoted the copying of illuminated manuscripts. By the age of 15 she had become a proficient artist and later her earnings from miniature painting were enough to support her mother and to keep her brother while he attended Sandhurst.

She wrote over 100 texts, articles, poems and songs, and knew such people as Sir Walter Scott, Charles Dickens, Lord Byron, Thomas Moore. She was also a historian, painter and novelist. Her father, Colonel James Francis Costello, died in April 1814 while fighting against Napoleon.

Among Costello's published works is her self-illustrated Memoirs of Eminent Englishwomen (1844), and several popular works of poetry and travel. Her collection Songs of a Stranger was dedicated to William Lisle Bowles. She returned to France only after her mother sent for her in 1815 or 1818, and then lived chiefly in Paris as a miniature-painter.

The Maid of the Cyprus Isle (1815) was among many books of travel, which were very popular, as were her novels, which drew chiefly on French history. Other works are Specimens of the Early Poetry of France (1835) and Béarn and the Pyrenees : A legendary Tour to the Country of Henri Quatre (1844). Her book The Rose Garden of Persia (1887) contains versions of poems or poem extracts taken from Persian, illustrated with imitations of Persian illuminations. There were reissues in 1888, 1899 and 1913.

Having never married, Costello died in Boulogne sur Mer, France, of mouth cancer.
