= Gilbert de Angulo =

Anglo-Norman knight

- Born: unknown
- Died: 1213
- Occupation: Baron

Gilbert de Angulo was an Anglo-Norman knight, fl. 1195–1213.

== Biography ==
A son of Jocelyn de Angulo, 1st Baron of Navan, Gilbert held the barony of Machaire Gaileng (Morgallion and Ratoath). Upon his rebellion due to unclear governance in 1195, all his lands were forfeited - given by Walter de Lacy to his brother, Hugh, about 1198 - and Gilbert and his brothers Phillip and William were temporarily outlawed.

Gilbert fled English jurisdiction and sought service with King Cathal Crobhdearg Ua Conchobair of Connacht. In return, Cathal granted him lands at Máenmag, in western Uí Maine. Upon his pardon in 1206, King John of England confirmed him in lands granted by King Cathal and made him a grant of other lands. Brought back into John's favour, he assisted Cathal in the construction of Caeluisce, near Ballyshannon, in 1212. It was attacked and burned the following year, and Gilbert was killed during the attack.

Gilbert also appears to have held land in Uí Lomain and Cineal Fheicin/Muntir Mailfinnain. However, as all his lands were held by new owners subsequent to Richard Mor de Burgh's settlement of Connacht in the 1230s, it appears his family had by then died out in the male line.

Some of Gilbert's descendants altered the names from D'Angulo to Nangle, and the branch of the family which settled near Mallow, County Cork, further changed the name to Nagle. The surname "Costello" is derived from Gilbert's second son, Hostilo. As such, descendants of Costello became "MacCostello".

== Annalistic references ==
From the Annals of the Four Masters:

- 1193 - "Inishcloghbran was plundered by the sons of Osdealv, and the sons of Conor Moinmoy."
- 1194 - "Gilbert Mac Costello marched, with an army, to Assaroe, but was compelled to return without being able to gain any advantage by his expedition."
- 1195 - "Cathal Crovderg O'Conor and Mac Costelloe, with some of the English and Irish of Meath, marched into Munster, and arrived at Imleach Iubhair (Emly) and Cashel. They burned four large castles and some small ones."
- 1211 - "An army was led by the Connacians, at the summons of the English bishop and Gilbert Mac Costello, to Assaroe; and they erected a castle at Cael-uisge."
- 1212 - "Gilbert Mac Costello was slain in the castle of Cael-uisge; and the castle itself was burned by O'Hegny."

== Family tree ==
  Joycelyn de Angulo, fl. 1172.
  |
  |_______________________________________________
  |                     |                        |
  |                     |                        |
  Gilbert      Phillip     William/William Mac Coisdealbhaigh
                                                 |  
                                                 |
                                  Miles Bregach Mac Coisdealbhaigh
                                                 |
                                _________________|__________________
                                |                |                 |
                                |                |                 |
                             Hugo, d. 1266?    Gilbert Mor      Phillip, fl. 1288.

== Literary reference ==
The Song of Dermot and the Earl (composed early 13th century) mentions the de Angulo family.

Original Anglo-Norman
De Huge de Laci vus conterai,

Cum il feffa ses baruns,
chevalers, serjans e garsunz.
[...]
A Gilibert de Nangle enfin
Donad tut Makerigalin;
A Jocelin donat le Novan
E la tere de Ardbrechan:
Li un ert fiz, li altre pere,
Solum le dit de la mere.

English translation
"Of Hugh de Lacy I shall tell you

How he enfeoffed his barons,
Knights, serjeants and retainers.
[...]
To Gilbert de Nangle, moreover
He gave the whole of Morgallion;
To Jocelin he gave the Naven,
And the lands of Ardbrackan,
(The one was son the other father,
According to the statement of the mother)
