= Abraham Isaac Castello =

Italian rabbi, preacher, and poet

Personal life
- Born: 1726 Ancona, Papal States
- Died: August 1, 1789 (aged 62–63) Leghorn, Tuscany
- Children: Joseph Castello

Religious life
- Religion: Judaism

Abraham Isaac Castello (1726 – August 1, 1789) was an Italian rabbi, preacher, and poet. At the age of thirteen he arrived, poor and destitute, in Livorno, where, although he had previously intended to become a mechanic, his agreeable voice induced him to prepare himself to become a cantor. After the death of Adam Bondi, cantor of the Jewish congregation in Livorno, whose daughter he had married, he became his successor. He then, with indefatigable diligence, devoted himself to the study of the Hebrew and Spanish languages, and to rabbinical science. He was soon advanced to the position of rabbi and preacher, in which capacity he so greatly distinguished himself that even Christian scholars delighted to discuss with him religious and philosophical topics. Castello is probably the Jewish scholar with whom Lessing conversed during his scientific tour in the company of Duke Leopold of Brunswick-Wolfenbüttel, and, on hearing whom, the duke is said to have exclaimed in astonishment, "Here we have one even greater than Mendelssohn—of far purer metaphysics." His son, Joseph Castello, was a physician in Italy.

Castello was the author of the following writings, all published at Livorno:

- Qol Millin, an allegorical drama in celebration of the wedding of Aaron Ergas and Deborah da Costa (1765)
- "Oracion Doctrinal" (1753)
- "A Memorial Sermon on the Death of Francis I. of Germany" (1765), written in Spanish, and translated by Castello's son Joseph Castello into Italian

Besides these there were several occasional poems in Hebrew published by Sal. Michell in Composizioni Poetiche (1788), and by A.B. Piperno in the collection Qol 'Ugab (1846).

== Bibliography ==
- Berliner, Abraham, in Israelitische Monatsschrift, supplement of Jüdischen Presse, 1898, pp. 21, 22
- Piperno, A.B., Qol 'Ugab, at end
- Nepi-Ghirondi, Toledot Gedole Yisrael, No. 51
- Luzzato, S.D., Epistolario Italiano-Francese, 1890, p. 734
- Roest, Catalog der Hebraica und Judaica aus der L. Rosenthal'schen Bibliothek, p. 256
