= Adam de Feypo =

Adam de Feypo is first mentioned in The Red Book of the Echequer 1166, p283 (England) as being one of the knights of Hugh de Lacy in Herefordshire, England. He was possibly a castellan of one of the de Lacy castles on the Welsh border. As the holdings of de Feypo in Herefordshire appear to have been modest it is no surprise that he reappears in Ireland in 1171 where there are great 'possibilities'.

== Ireland's Attraction ==
Why were the Early Normans drawn to Ireland? They were like all settlers interested in making a better life for themselves and enhancing their wealth. Ireland was the 'Wild West' of their day and Giraldus Cambrensis painted an attractive picture of this island.

'This is the most temperate of all countries. Cancer does not here drive you to take shade from the burning heat: nor does the cold of Capricorn send you rushing to the fire. You will seldom see snow here, and then it lasts only a short time. But cold weather does come with the winds here, not only from the west-north-west and north but equally from the east, the Favonius and the Zephyr. Nevertheless, they are all moderate winds and none of them is too strong. The grass is green in the fields in winter just as in summer. Consequently the meadows are not cut for fodder, nor do they build stalls for their beasts. The country enjoys the freshness and mildness of spring almost all year round. The air is so healthy that there is no disease-bearing cloud, or pestilential vapour, or corrupting breeze. The island has little use for doctors. You will not find many sick men here, except those that are actually on the point of death. There is scarcely any mean between constant health and final death. Anyone born here, who has never left its healthy soil and air, if he be the native people never suffers from the three kinds of fevers. They suffer only from ague (a cold!) and even that is only seldom'

=== Irish Prospects ===
The inducements for Adam de Feypo to come to Ireland were possibly twofold. Firstly it would have been his duty to his overlord, de Lacy. Secondly, the colonisation opportunities were enormous which included the prospect of much land. He eventually ended up with over 40,000 acres. Not only was there status but adventure as well as the profits from corn, animals and timber and the abundance of cheap labour.

== Service ==
When Hugh de Lacy was involved in the Conquest of Ireland in 1171 with Strongbow, Adam de Feypo was one of the knights he placed in charge of a number of his troops and who fought alongside him. On the successful outcome, for King Henry's occupying army, Hugh de Lacy had the Kingdom of Meath and Dublin bestowed on him. Hugh then established a defensive shield around Dublin by granting land to a number of his loyal knights. As part of this cordon, Adam de Feypo was granted Santry, by the spring of 1173, before de Lacy had to go off to Normandy in the service of King Henry.

In further recognition of his services and the high regard that Hugh de Lacy had for Adam de Feypo he was granted a castle, the lands of Skryne and the estates of 21 soldiers (Chartul. St Mary's Dublin ii, 21)

Transcript of that charter, dated before 1176, made by Sir James Ware is –

'Hugh de Lacy gave Adam de Feypo for his service
the estates of 21 soldiers, that is to say, Escrin. With these
witnesses; Richard de Bellofago and Maurice the son
of Gerald; Roheis his wife.',

=== The Song of Dermot and the Earl ===
(Translated by G.H.Orpen of Trinity College, Dublin from the Norman-French, Carew Manuscript 596),

Adam appears listed as one of de Lacy's chief beneficiaries –

'Of Hugh de Lacy I shall tell you
How he enfeoffed his barons,
Knights, serjeants and retainers

And Skryne he then gave by charter
To Adam de Feypo he gave it'

== Skryne ==
We do know from Adam that by 1175 he had built his castle at Skryne which included within it a chapel dedicated to St Nicholas, a favourite Norman saint. The tithes and grants to this church were confirmed by Pope Alexander III (John, ibit.86 and Chartul. St Mary's, Dublin, i, 92.). The extent of the land in Skryne was 20,000 acres (8,000 ha) and this fertile land was bordered by the river Boyne along its west and north sides. The hill of Skryne with its castle, the only one in Adam de Feypo's fiefdom which has a motte, is in the centre of his lands. The ancient and historical Hill of Tara lay directly to the west while to the southwest lay Killen, the 'parish' of his relative Geoffrey de Cusack. (The original 1659 map showing the Barony of Skryne and the lands of Adam de Feypo is held in the Bibliothèque Nationale, Paris). Adam did eventually achieve, by grants and other means, of which we know nothing, around 40,000 statute acres. His descendants used the customary title Baron Skryne, although it was not recognised in the Peerage of Ireland.

=== Adam's Relatives ===
The records show that Adam had a number of relations around him, in Ireland, at this time. His brother Thomas and also three other de Feypos – Amauri (the Elder), Amauri (The Younger) and Roger. Adam had four sons – Richard, John, Geoffrey and Gerard and a nephew Mahout also a relative named Geoffrey de Cusack from Cussac, France. The only females mentioned are Adam's wife Lucy and Geoffrey's wife Matilda le Petit.

== Communications ==
It is interesting to see that the early Normans like the Romans in Britain upgraded and built special roads along which to move their troops and goods. In Ireland, these were called 'royal roads' and two charters c1191 describe one which ran from Skryne to Tara (Chartul, St Mary's, Dublin, i, 97,98). During King Henry I's reign the specifications for such roads were laid down. They were constructed so that water would always drain off them. They had to be always open i.e. they could not be closed for toll, blocked or have their course changed. They had to be wide enough for two wagons to pass and most significantly for sixteen knights armed and mounted to ride side by side. The 'postal/carrier service' seems to have been very good for there were regular communications to and from King Henry in England and even Pope Clement III in Rome as witnessed by the Pope's reply to one of Adam's gifts in 1188 (CSM, i, pp. 157–159)

Much of the information on the characters who feature in the records of the Norman Conquest of Ireland and the years since come from ecclesiastical records and charters.

=== Gifts to Llanthony ===
What was the connection between Adam and Llanthony Priory in Wales? It all stems from a William de Lacy who was a knight of Hugh de Lacy. Around the year 1100, William came across a ruined chapel in the Welsh mountains and decided to devote himself to solitary prayer and study there. After a time he was joined by others and a small religious community quickly grew. It was only natural that Adam who was an original knight of Hugh de Lacy and who had received lands from him would show his gratitude in making gifts to both Llanthony Priory in Wales and Llanthony Secunda in Gloucester, England. It should also be noted that Adam's relative Geoffrey de Cusack also gave tithes to both these priories possibly for the same reason.

=== Gifts to St. Mary's ===
There were also many gifts, involving Adam after his death, to St Mary's, Dublin executed in his name by charter between 1192 and 1200 and ratified by Pope Clement III. One of these is confirmed by Bishop Simon and the following is the acknowledgement

'To the monastery of St.Mary, near Dublin, and the monks of the Cistercian Order serving God there, all the churches and chapels and all the ecclesiastical benefices, lands possessions, tithes and offerings, and all things which they at present justly and peacefully possess in our diocese, or which they will be able in the future to obtain as a kind gift by the generosity of princes and offerings of the faithful or by any other just title
Among these we have caused the following to be mentioned by their special names:
The church of Saint Columba of Scrin, with the chapel of Saint Nicholas belonging to the castle of Scrin, with all churches, chapels, tithes, offerings and all other ecclesiastical benefices and all that belongs to them from the estate and seigniory of Scrin, that is to say Geoffrey de Cusack, Amauri de Feypo the elder, Walter Duff, William Garbe, A.Beg, Richard Talbot, Walter de Folevill, Robert de Aveni, Maurice de Beaufussel, Stephen de Kent, Ranulph, Robert Coci, Walter Lescuier.'

== Adam's Burial ==
Adam de Feypo, died c.1190/91, drew up instructions for his burial at St.Mary's Abbey as follows (Churtul. St.Mary's, Dublin, i, 93)

Let it be known to all, both those now living and posterity, to whom the present document may come, that I Adam de Feypo, while I was still alive and of sound mind, offered to God and solemnly promise my body to be buried in the monastery of the Blessed Mary of Dublin, where the white monks serve God, and where my brother Thomas (born of the same parents) assumed the habit of religion, and to which monastery I had formerly granted a certain grange, together with all ecclesiastical benefits of all property which I held between Dublin and the river Boyne.

It is thought that Adam's body still lies buried beneath a Dublin street between the Chapter House in Meeting House Lane and the City Fruit and Vegetable Market.

== Sources ==
- Skryne and the Early Normans by Elizabeth Hickey. 1994. ISBN 9780950033266
