= Jocelyn de Angulo =

Anglo-Norman knight

Jocelyn de Angulo, 1st Baron of Navan (fl. 1172), was an Anglo-Norman knight.

== Biography ==
De Angulo was one of fifty knights serving under Hugh de Lacy upon the latter's grant of the Lordship of Meath by King Henry II of England in 1172. Jocelyn was awarded the title Baron of Navan by de Lacy. He had sons Gilbert, Philip and William, all of whom would be outlawed for rebellion due to unclear governance in 1195 before being pardoned in 1206. He built a fort at Navan, the origin of the town, of which he can be called the founder.

Jocelyn is believed to have derived his surname from his homeplace of Angle, Pembrokeshire.

== Philip de Angulo ==
Philip was an Anglo-Irish knight, fl. 1195–1206, son of Jocelyn de Angulo of Meath, Philip and his two brothers, Gilbert and William, were outlawed for rebellion in 1195 and had their lands confiscated. However, in 1206 King John of England pardoned them, Philip being allowed to inherit his father's estates at Navan. From his brother, William de Angulo, descend the Connacht families of Waldron, and others. He is considered an ancestor of Nano Nagle.

== William de Angulo ==
William was an Anglo-Irish knight, fl. 1195–1206, and son of Jocelyn de Angulo. William was associated with the rebellion of his brothers Gilbert and Philip in 1195, and likewise pardoned in 1206. He held lands in Meath under Walter de Lacy which were returned to him upon his pardon. He is the ancestor of the Mac Jordan Duff, Mac Phillip, de Bhaldraithe/Mac Bhaldrin/Waldron clans of County Mayo.

== Genealogical tree ==
Tree of Clann Coisdealbhaugh

Joycelyn de Angulo fl. 1172
William de Angulo aka William Mac; Coisdealbhaigh
Miles Bregach; Mac Coisdealbhaigh
Hugo d. 1266? | Gilbert; Mor | Phillip fl. 1288
Jordan d. 1324? | Gilbert Og k. 1333 | Jordan; Duff | Baldraithe /Baldrin
John | John fl. 1366 | Mac; Jordan; Duff | Mac; Phillip
Jordan na Bertaighecht
Edmond an Machaire k. 1437 | William
John Duff d. 1487 | William | Walter
Gilleduff | Walter k. 1545 | John Dubh fl. 1536 | Jordan; Glegil | Hubert | John
Jordan | John k. 1536 | Rudhraighe | Piers k. 1555 | William | Gilladuff | Thomas | Jordan; Boy
Jordan; Buidhe | Jordan | William | David | Edmond | John fl. 1586 | Walter | David | Dubhaltach
Edmond | John | Jordan; Buide | William; Caech k. 1589 | David | Richard | Edmond | William | Calvach | Jordan; Boy fl. 1585
Tomás Láidir; Mac; Coisdealbhaigh fl. 1660s | Dubhaltach; Caoch Mac; Coisdealbhaigh k. 3 March 1667 | Edmond; Dubh | Calbach; Ban

== Literary reference ==
The Song of Dermot and the Earl (composed early 13th century) mentions the de Angulo family.

Original Anglo-Norman
De Huge de Laci vus conterai,

Cum il feffa ses baruns,
chevalers, serjans e garsunz.
[...]
A Gilibert de Nangle enfin
Donad tut Makerigalin;
A Jocelin donat le Novan
E la tere de Ardbrechan:
Li un ert fiz, li altre pere,
Solum le dit de la mere.

English translation
"Of Hugh de Lacy I shall tell you

How he enfeoffed his barons,
Knights, serjeants and retainers.
[...]
To Gilbert de Nangle, moreover
He gave the whole of Morgallion;
To Jocelin he gave the Naven,
And the lands of Ardbrackan,
(The one was son the other father,
According to the statement of the mother)
