= Elizabeth Hickey =

Irish historian and author

Elizabeth Hickey (1917–1999) was an Irish historian and author who lived at Skryne Castle near Tara in County Meath. The doyenne and best known of Meath historians, she wrote on a variety of topics. According to The Irish Times, she typified the immense contribution of local historians to Irish history, "through her long and rewarding passion for the rich history of Co Meath, producing valuable books, articles and insights."

== Life ==
She was born in Edinburgh in 1917 as Elizabeth Agnes Malet-Warden. Her mother, Agnes Helen née Pennycuick, was the daughter of a civil servant in Ceylon, and the granddaughter of Brigadier-General John Pennycuick, and her father, Edward C Malet-Warden, was an Engineer-Commandant in the Royal Navy, with a particular enthusiasm for naval history, while her brother, John Hamish, joined the Royal Air Force and was killed in action while on a bombing raid over Cologne in 1941. She was educated at the Nairn Academy, near Inverness in Scotland, and later she qualified with a degree in English and History from Trinity College, Dublin. She then went on to do dress design and later worked for a year in that capacity at the Gate Theatre in Dublin.

In 1941 she married Noel Sydney Falkiner Hickey, the younger son of R. S. Hickey of Hyde Park, Killucan, and had five children (Robin, Peter, Eoin – of Lucan, the former proprietor of Finnstown House Hotel – Netta and Caroline) although they later separated with Noel living in London and her staying in the castle at Skryne, County Meath. It was when she went to live in that old castle overlooking Tara that she really started to take a great interest in archaeology and local history. As part of this she spent two years studying archaeology with Professor Seán P. Ó Ríordáin at University College Dublin.

At first she wrote for The Irish Times and the Journal of the Royal Society of Antiquaries of Ireland but it was with the founding of the Meath Historical and Archaeological Society in the late 1950s that she found a ready outlet for her research. She was also very interested in literature and tried her hand at fiction, writing I send my love along the Boyne in 1966. In later years, along with so many Meath historians, she tried to preserve the county's heritage from the ravages of the Irish government. She was successful though in preserving the bridge at Kilcarn, an ancient stone bridge across the River Boyne, located on the Dublin side of Navan, although she became quite disillusioned in subsequent years with the lack of interest in matters historical and in the problems of getting Irish history works published.

Probably the most famous of her works was The Green Cockatrice, originally published under the pseudonym "Basil Iske". In this she traced the career of William Nugent, one time Baron of Skryne. She felt that he was a good candidate for the authorship of Shakespeare's works, a view she held to in subsequent years. She even corresponded with Enoch Powell on the subject, another person who was sceptical of the Stratford story.

Her book Skryne and the Early Normans also reflects her love of the area. She researched in detail the Monument to Sir Thomas Cusack.

She died on 12 January 1999 aged 81 years, and was cremated after her funeral in Navan.

== Works ==
Books
Guide Book to Tara (1954)
I send my love along the Boyne (Dublin, 1966), illustrated by Nano Reid.
The legend of Tara (Dundalk, 1976)
The Green Cockatrice (Tara, 1978)
Skryne and the Early Normans (Tara, 1994)
The Irish Life of St Finian of Clonard (Meath, 1996)
Clonard: the story of an early Irish monastery (Leixlip, 1999)
Articles
"St Mary's Abbey and the church at Skryne", Journal of the Royal Society of Antiquaries of Ireland vol 82 pt2 1952.
"The Cursing of Tara", Irish Times 5 Nov 1952.
"Some observations on the usage of the word 'mote' in mediaeval times" Ríocht na Midhe vol 2 pt2 1960 p. 37–39.
"The House of Cleitech." Ríocht na Midhe vol 3 pt3 1965 p. 181–185.
"The Cusacks of Portraine and Rathaldron, Co. Meath," Ríocht na Midhe vol 4 pt4 1970 p. 58–61.
"Monument to Sir Thomas Cusack," Ríocht na Midhe vol 5 pt1 1971 p. 75–91.
"A description of the Marward stone at Skryne and a discussion on John Cusack who sculptured it," Ríocht na Midhe vol 5 pt3 1973 p. 49–55.
"The Wakelys of Navan And Ballyburly, a discussion of a 16th-century family", Ríocht na Midhe vol 5 pt4 1974 p. 3–19.
"A medieval stone at Saint John's Cemetery, Kells", same vol as above p. 3–19.
"The Bishop and the stone", Ríocht na Midhe vol 6 pt1 1975 p. 59–64.
"Some Notes on Kilbixy, Tristernagh and Templecross, and the family of Piers who lived in the Abbey of Tristernagh in Westmeath", Ríocht na Midhe vol 7 pt1 1980–81 p. 52–75.
"Epitaph on Edmund Malone in the Malone Mausoleum at Kilbixy church, Westmeath", Ríocht na Midhe vol 7 pt2 1982–83 p. 119–121.
"Three stone heads from Macetown", Ríocht na Midhe vol 7 pt3 1984 p. 112–113.
"Royal heraldry and some Irish arms at Trim, County Meath", Ríocht na Midhe vol 8 pt2 1988–89 p. 129–140.
"The monastery of eremite friars of Saint Augustine at Skryne, Co. Meath", Ríocht na Midhe vol 8 pt3 1990–91 p. 145–150.

== See also ==
- Ó hÍceadha

== Sources ==
- Irish Times 13 January 1999
- Irish Times 17 Feb 2001
- Irish Times 15 Jan 1955
- http://www.xs4all.nl/~tbreen/Journals/Meath.html
