= Cusick =

Cusick is an Anglo-Irish and Anglo-Norman surname. Notable people with the surname include:

- David Cusick (c.1780–c.1831), Tuscarora artist and the author of David Cusick's Sketches of Ancient History of the Six Nations (1828)
- Fred Cusick (1918–2009), American ice hockey broadcaster who served as the Boston Bruins play-by-play announcer for 45 years
- Henry Ian Cusick (born 1967), Scottish-Peruvian actor
- Johnny Cusick (1916–?) English boxer
- Michael Cusick (born 1969), Democratic Party politician, member of the New York State Assembly from the 63rd District
- Raymond Cusick (1928–2013), English art director and production designer
- Richie Tankersley Cusick (born 1952), American writer
- Ryan Cusick (born 1999), American baseball player
- Suzanne Cusick (born 1954), American musicologist
