= Timothy M. Costelloe =

American philosopher (born 1964)

- Born: 1964 (age 61–62)

Education
- Education: Emory University (PhD in Philosophy, 2001), Boston University (PhD in Sociology, 1996)

Philosophical work
- Era: 21st-century philosophy
- Region: Western philosophy
- Institutions: College of William & Mary
- Main interests: Aesthetics, philosophy of art, David Hume, British aesthetic tradition

Timothy M. Costelloe is an American philosopher and professor of philosophy at the College of William & Mary. His research focuses on aesthetics, moral philosophy, and the philosophy of art in the eighteenth and nineteenth centuries, particularly the work of David Hume and the British aesthetic tradition.

== Books ==
- Costelloe, Timothy M. Aesthetics and Morals in the Philosophy of David Hume. Routledge, 2007.
- Costelloe, Timothy M. The British Aesthetic Tradition: From Shaftesbury to Wittgenstein. Cambridge University Press, 2013.
- Costelloe, Timothy M. The Imagination in Hume’s Philosophy: The Canvas of the Mind. Edinburgh University Press, 2018.
- (ed.) Costelloe, Timothy M. The Sublime: From Antiquity to the Present. Cambridge University Press, 2012.
