= Morgallion =

Barony in County Meath, Ireland

Morgallion (Irish: Machaire Gaileang, "plain of the Gailenga") is one of the baronies that comprise county Meath, Ireland.

In 1172 King Henry II of England granted the Lordship of Meath to Hugh de Lacy to hold as King Murrough O Melaghlin held it. Once established de Lacy proceeded to divide up his newly acquired territory into feudal grants to his chief followers. He granted the territory of the Gaileanga-Mor sept (the lands of Magherigalon, later to be known as the Barony of Morgallion) to Gilbert de Angulo, who had arrived from Wales in 1171. The caput of the barony was at Nobber where de Angulo constructed a Motte close to the site of an earlier ecclesiastical site.
