= Irish military diaspora =

Irish people or people of Irish descent who fought in, or along with foreign militaries

The Irish military diaspora refers to the many people of either Irish birth or extraction (see Irish diaspora) who have served in overseas military forces, regardless of rank, duration of service, or success.

Many overseas military units were primarily made up of Irishmen (or members of the Irish military diaspora) and had the word 'Irish', an Irish place name or an Irish person in the unit's name. 'Irish' named military units took part in numerous conflicts throughout world history. The first military unit of this kind was in the Spanish Netherlands during the Eighty Years' War between Spain and the Dutch. A notable example is that of Owen Roe O'Neill.

== Australia and New Zealand ==
The British colonies of Australia and New Zealand suffered a series of 'war scares' during the 19th century from perceived threats from France and Russia. In 1870, when the last British troops left, defence became the responsibility of locally raised colonial forces.

=== New Zealand ===
Among the British fencibles (British army soldiers given land) in 1847 many of them were Irishmen. The first Irish unit formed was in New Zealand – the Christchurch Royal Irish Rifle Volunteers were gazetted on 18 November 1868, re-designated No. 2 (Royal Irish) Company Christchurch R.V. on 4 April 1871, and then disbanded on 11 August 1874.

On 29 April 1885, a meeting was held in Christchurch, New Zealand and 95 members of the Irish community applied to form an Irish volunteer corps. That was accepted on 30 April 1885 as the Canterbury Irish Rifle Volunteers.

On 1 June 1892, they were amalgamated with the Sydenham R.V. to form the Christchurch City R.V., gazetted 22 July 1892.

New Zealand's Dunedin Irish R.V. were formed on 7 May 1885, when 189 men offered their services. The Dunedin Irish R.V. became part of the 1st Battalion Otago R.V. on 25 January 1886 and were disbanded on 13 September 1893.

One other Irish Corps was to be formed in the South Island of New Zealand, the Southland Irish R.V., were formed at Invercargill and accepted 10 June 1885 as an Honorary Corps. On 7 August 1885, it applied to be formed into a Garrison Corps and then disbanded on 9 July 1886.

Another N.Z. Irish corps was proposed during a 'war scare' in 1885, the Temuka Irish Rifles, on 13 June 1885, but the proposal was abandoned when the government deemed it improbable that hostilities would ensue.

Another Irish corps was proposed on 3 April 1887 and was accepted on 24 June as the Auckland Royal Irish R. V. On 13 August 1887, they were posted to the 3rd Battalion Auckland R.V. When inspected on 6 October 1889, they had a total strength of 93 officers and men and they were disbanded on 5 March 1892.

The last Irish Corps to be formed in New Zealand was the Irish R.V. (Wanganui), accepted 22 October 1901. They were attached to the 2nd Battalion Wellington (West Coast) R.V. and 'J' Company, formed 16 April 1902, becoming 'I' Company on 1 November 1904.

The N.Z. Defence Act of 1911 saw an end to the volunteer system, the Wanganui Irish (by then 'H' Company) were absorbed into the new territorial system when the 2nd Battalion Wellington (West Coast) R.V. were re-designated, 7th Regiment (Wellington West Coast Rifles) on 17 March 1911.

An Irish Caubeen was worn by the Nelson, Marlborough, and West Coast Regiment, which came about after a regimental alliance with the Royal Irish Fusiliers, which took place on 23 September 1949. The blue caubeen and green hackle of the Royal Irish Fusiliers were formally presented to the NMWC Regiment at a Barrosa Day parade in 1961 but may have been worn on special anniversaries and parades before that. On 24 January 1964, the Ist Battalion Nelson, Marlborough, and West Coast Regiment amalgamated into the 2nd Battalion (Canterbury, Nelson, Marlborough, West Coast) Royal New Zealand Infantry Regiment. N.Z. Army Headquarters ruled that only "A" and "B" Companies of the new regiment were to wear the caubeen and hackle on dates significant to the regiment. That was found to be unworkable and so the caubeen and hackle were not worn until 1968 when the ruling was changed. Only officers and warrant officers seem to have worn the caubeen during formal parades, and the RNZIR cedar green beret was worn for everyday use. By the early 1990s. all ranks were wearing the caubeen and hackle. On the formation of the Royal Irish Rangers in 1969, the green caubeen of the Irish Rangers was adopted by the New Zealanders. The 2RNZIR discontinued wearing the caubeen in the 1990s due to financial constraints, and it was replaced by the cedar green beret. In November 1998, the NZ mounted rifles "lemon-squeezer" hat was introduced army-wide and was worn for formal parades, while the beret was worn for everyday use. In 1999, the rifle green beret was adopted for the New Zealand army and was phased-in in late 2002. The 2nd (Canterbury, Nelson, Marlborough, West Coast) Battalion Group, as the unit was known then, wore the green hackle on the left side of the mounted rifle hat. That was to signify the continued association with the Royal Irish Regiment.

=== Australia (pre-Federation) ===
==== Queensland ====
An offer to form an Irish Corps in the British colony of Queensland, Australia, had been rejected in 1862.

Eighteen years after the formation of the first Irish Corps in New Zealand, a Queensland Irish Volunteer Corps were proposed on 18 February 1887 and gazetted on 24 February 1887 as 'A' Company Queensland Irish Rifle Corps.

Established at Peel Street, South Brisbane with three officers and 100 other ranks, 'B' and 'C' companies quickly followed, formed on 11 March 1887 at Valley, North Brisbane and on 22 March 1887 at Petrie Terrace, West Brisbane.

'D' Company was formed at Gympie on 14 November 1888 with an establishment of three officers and 90 other ranks. The application to form this unit had been submitted on 27 May 1887. The application to form a company at Ipswich was submitted on 26 August 1889. They were gazetted on 4 September 1889 as 'E' Company and had a strength of three officers and 90 other ranks.

Gazetted the same day were 'F' Company established at Woolloongabba, East Brisbane, with three officers and 90 other ranks.

The final company raised was 'G' Company at Maryborough and again with three officers and 90 other ranks, on 4 December 1889.

An application in March 1887, signed by over 100 men willing to form an Irish Corps at Rockhampton came to nothing.

'G' Company at Maryborough was the first to disband on 6 August 1891, followed by 'D' Company at Gympie on 7 November 1894.

In a re-organisation during 1896, the Queensland Irish Volunteer Corps were designated 3rd (Queensland Irish) Battalion, Regiment of Queensland Rifles and 'A', 'B', 'C', 'E' and 'F' companies became 'I' ,'J', 'K', 'M', and 'N' companies. On 30 July 1897, 'I', 'K', and 'M' Companies were disbanded; 'L' and 'N' companies were disbanded by August the following year, and this brought to an end the Volunteer Corps in Queensland.

==== New South Wales ====
In November 1895, a meeting was held in Sydney Town Hall when it was decided to form an Irish Rifle Corps.

These companies were established and gazetted on 5 March 1896, as the New South Wales Irish Rifles. They were grouped together with St George Rifles and the Scottish Rifles to form an administrative regiment, designated the 5th (Union Volunteer) New South Wales Infantry Regiment on 20 June 1896. Another Irish company was formed in Sydney in 1998.

http://www.planetfigure.com/threads/australia-nsw-irish-rifle-regiment-1900.79431/

NSW Irish Rifles – belt-buckle

http://www.diggerhistory.info/pages-conflicts-periods/other/irish_rifle.htm

On 1 July 1899, these national companies split to form their own distinct regiments, and the Irish were re-designated as the 8th Union Volunteer Infantry Regiment (Irish Rifles).

Badges of the 8th Union Volunteers Infantry Regiment (Irish Rifles)

https://harrowercollection.com.au/33rd-infantry-regiment/

For administrative purposes, two non-Irish companies from the Illawarra district (one at Kogarah and one at Bulli) were attached.

A further Irish Company was formed at Newcastle, the men being sworn in during June 1900.

Twenty-three men of the 8th (Irish Rifles) fought in the Boer War.

The 8th Union Volunteers Infantry Regiment (Irish Rifles) was re-designated NSW Irish Rifle Regiment (Volunteers) in 1903, and then became the 1st Battalion NSW Irish Rifle Regiment in 1908.

A major re-organisation in 1912 saw the name change to 33rd Infantry Regiment and, in yet another re-organisation in 1918, changed to the 55th Battalion.

In 1927 the old NSW Irish Rifles title was revived. The 'Irish connection' finally came to an end in 1930, when the regiment was re-designated as the NSW Rifle Regiment.

NSW Irish Rifles ('Vice Regal' cigarette-card)

https://sites.google.com/site/irishregimentsoftheempire/australia-and-new-zealand

New South Wales Irish Rifles - hat badge variations

https://sites.google.com/site/irishregimentsoftheempire/australia-and-new-

==== South Australia ====
The South Australian Register, dated 13 February 1900, carried the following public notice: "A meeting of all interested in the formation of an Irish Rifle Corps will be held on Tuesday 20 February at 8pm in the town hall."

Afterwards 157 names of volunteers were taken, and after selection, were to become 'F' (Irish) Company, 1st Battalion Adelaide Rifles. At the formation of the Irish Company, it was suggested that a green uniform be worn, but no distinctive uniform was adopted. although a shamrock worked from black braid was worn on the uniform sleeves, and hand-engraved brass harp collar badges were worn. They were worn until January 1910, when the company was ordered to discontinue wearing them, which they did under protest. That was done to secure uniformity of dress with the other companies in the 10th AIR. A green stripe an inch wide was also approved to be worn on the trouser seams, but was later disallowed.

==== Victoria ====
Attempts had been made to form other Irish Corps. A five hundred strong Irish Australian Volunteer Corps was proposed in Melbourne Victoria in April 1885. A number of meetings were held at St. Patrick's Cathedral Hall.

=== Australia (post-Federation) ===
With the formation of the Australian Commonwealth military forces in 1903, the Adelaide Rifles became part of the newly formed 10th Australian Infantry Regiment. That had been the last Irish unit to be formed in Australia.

Steps were also taken in May 1901 and May 1910, to form an Irish Australian Regiment in Melbourne, and again in 1941. An Irish Volunteer Corps was proposed at a meeting held in the dining rooms of the Shamrock Hotel, in Perth Western Australia on 18 April 1900. Another Irish corps was proposed in Perth in 1904. An Irish regiment was suggested at Bendigo Victoria in April 1906, and a company of Irish Rifles was considered at Broken Hill NSW in April 1910. An Irish corps was also proposed in Queensland, as part of the 9th Australian Infantry Regiment (Moreton) in 1906. Committees were often appointed, but the corps were never formed.

The 4th Battalion, Royal Australian Regiment (4 RAR); an infantry battalion formed on 1 February 1964, and renamed the 2nd Commando Regiment on 19 June 2009. 4 R.A.R. is affiliated with Britain's 4th Regiment of Foot Guards (The Irish Guards). The 4 R.A.R. regimental band use the same uniform as the Pipes and Drums of the Irish Guards. The 4 R.A.R. battalion subsequently served in Malaysia as part of the Far East Strategic Reserve from August 1965 to September 1967, and seeing active service in Borneo against the Indonesian army during the Indonesia-Malaysia confrontation. The battalion began its first 12-month tour of Vietnam on 1 June 1968, returning to Vietnam for its second tour in May 1971. From 1990 to 1993 many individual soldiers from the battalion served with the United Nations in Cambodia. In 1993, soldiers from the battalion were detached for operational service in Somalia. In May 1993, the battalion deployed troops to Cambodia. In 1994, the battalion deployed Rwanda. In 1996, a decision was made to convert 4 RAR to a special forces unit. On 1 February 1997, was renamed to 4 RAR (Commando). The unit conducted operations in East Timor and Iraq, and later lost soldiers killed-in-action during the war in Afghanistan.

2/4 RAR Irish Pipes and Drums https://24rarassociation.com/?page_id=1076 (see image 66)

== Austria and Austria-Hungary ==
The Habsburgs were the principal employers of Irish soldiers in Central Europe. The multinational nature of the empire meant that gifted foreigners were always welcome and had opportunities not available in other Eastern and Central European countries. By one estimation, over 100 Irishmen were field marshals, generals, or admirals in the Austrian Army, with a corresponding number of men holding commissions in the lower ranks. The first Irishman of note to serve the Habsburgs was Colonel Richard Walsh of Carrickmines, Dublin, who was mortally wounded at the Battle of Lützen. His son Oliver became a Major-General. In all, eleven members of this family were field marshals or generals, the most notable being George Olivier, count of Wallis.

Many Irishmen were Inhaber and held rank as regimental colonels. Jacob Butler is the first of these. Walter Butler was an Inhaber of a dragoon regiment and received praise for his role in the defence of Frankfurt an der Oder. Butler was responsible for the assassination of the Bohemian general Albrecht von Wallenstein, who was in the process of defecting to the Swedes. Another Irishman to serve as field marshal was Francis Taaffe, 3rd Earl of Carlingford. While attending the Jesuit college at Olomouc, he came to know Charles V, Duke of Lorraine, and this benefited his career greatly. He played a prominent role in saving Vienna in 1683 and in the subsequent conflict with the Turks. He later became a member of the Order of the Golden Fleece and served Charles V as his prime minister.

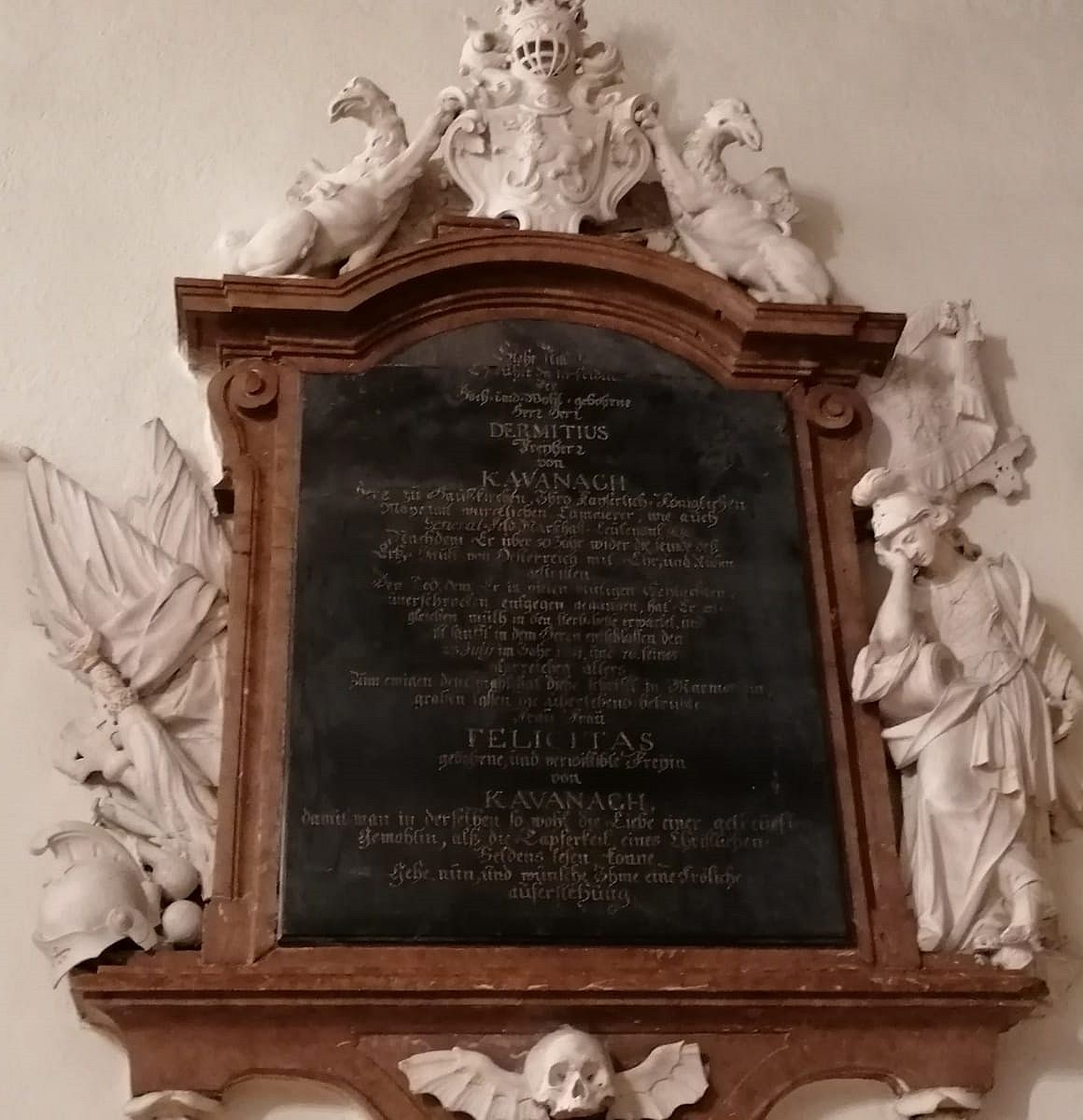
Wall tablet to Dermitius Freiherr von Kavanagh at St Lawrence Church, Hauskirchen, Lower Austria

Baron Dermot Kavanagh († 1739) of Ballyane, County Wexford, served from his youth in the Imperial Army and took part in campaigns in Hungary, Italy and Flanders. At the imperial and royal court of Vienna he held the office of Kämmerer. In 1723 he bought the manor of Hauskirchen in Lower Austria from Prince Joseph von Liechtenstein. From 1727 to 1734 he commanded the Czech Dragoon Regiment No. 7 while holding the rank of colonel. In 1734 he was promoted to Generalfeldwachtmeister and the following year Kavanagh rose to the rank of lieutenant field marshal. He died in 1739 of wounds received during the siege of Belgrade. Kavanagh and his wife Felicitas are commemorated by a monument with an inscription in the parish church of St Lawrence at Hauskirchen, which names him in Latin as Dermitius Freiherr von Kavanagh.

Maximilian Ulysses Browne was of the first generation born in Austria but was from a prominent Limerick family. Through his mother, he was descended from the FitzGeralds, Earls of Desmond. Browne was a major-general by the age of 30. He rose to the rank of Generalfeldmarschall and died leading his men into battle during the Battle of Prague. Browne was a kinsman and mentor to Franz Moritz von Lacy (son of Peter Lacy) who rose to be president of the Hofkriegsrat from 1766 to 1774. Other famous Irish-Austrian generals included William O'Kelly from Aughrim in County Galway; John Sigismund Maguire of County Kerry, who captured Dresden in 1758 and successfully defended it against Frederick the Great, who mentioned him on a number of occasions; and General Karl O'Donnell, was known for his exceptional conduct at the Battle of Torgau. Meanwhile, Colonel Hume Caldwell of County Fermanagh was noted for his conduct at Breslau and Olmütz, where he perished. Unusually, Caldwell was of Protestant origin. Field Marshal Laval Nugent von Westmeath was prominent during the Napoleonic Wars and was most noted for his role in the capture of Rome in 1815. In recognition of this, Pope Pius VI made him a prince in 1816. There were no Irish regiments in the Austrian Army with influence confined to nobility serving as officers.

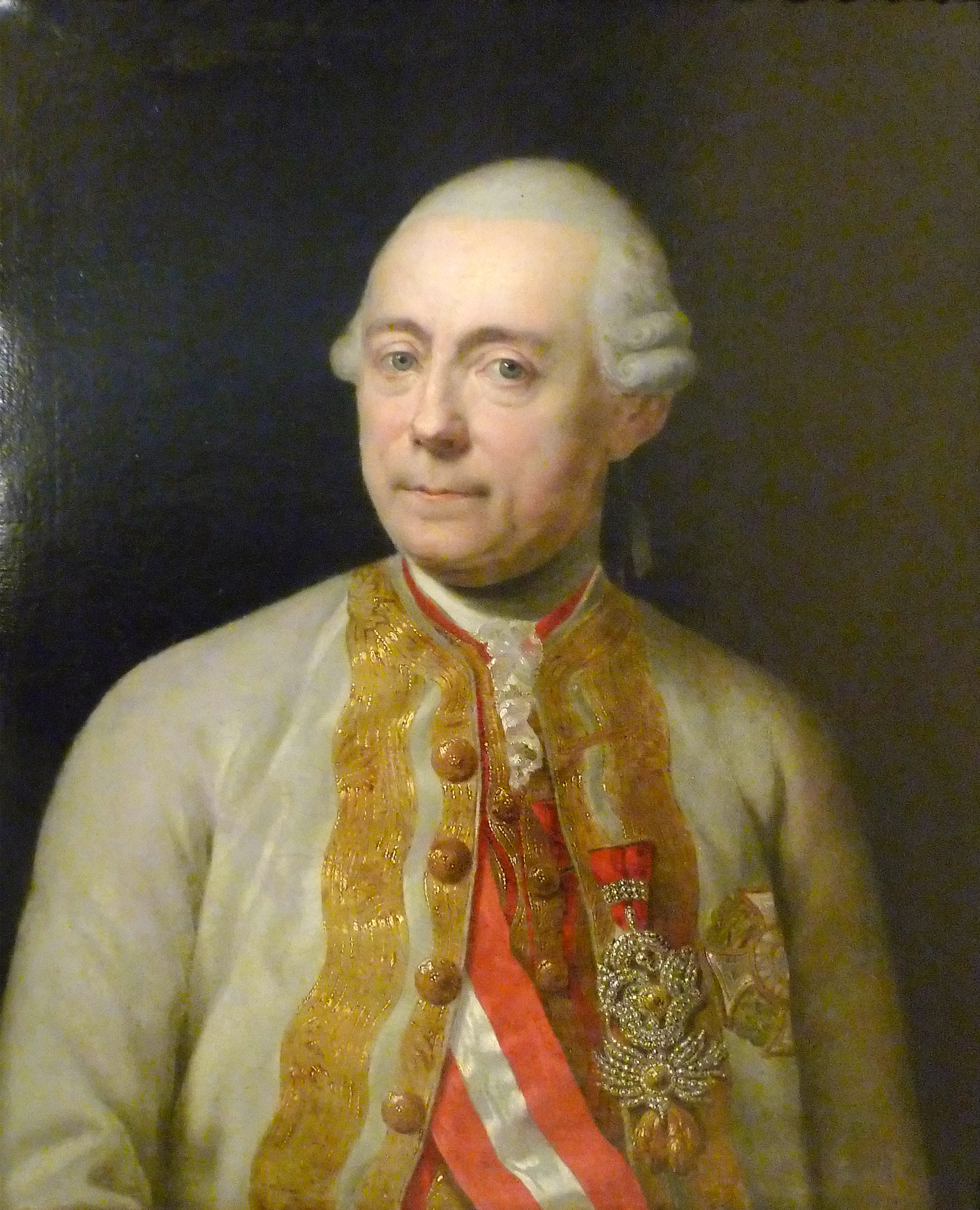
Franz Moritz von Lacy

=== Notable Commanders ===
- Major Peter Martyn
- Franz Moritz Graf von Lacy
- Andreas Graf O'Reilly von Ballinlough
- Maximilian Ulysses Graf von Browne
- George Olivier, count of Wallis
- Francis Taaffe, 3rd Earl of Carlingford
- Laval Graf Nugent von Westmeath
- Maximilian Graf O'Donnell von Tyrconnell
- Karl O'Donnell
- Gottfried Freiherr von Banfield
- General Thomas Brady
- Captain Art Ó Laoghaire
- General Charles Edward Jennings – Baron Kilmaine, called Brave Kilmaine in the French Revolutionary Wars
- James Butler
- Risteárd Buidhe Kirwan
- Peter Lacy
- James Patrick Mahon
- Henry Nugent
- Manus O'Donell
- Maurice O'Donnell

== Great Britain ==
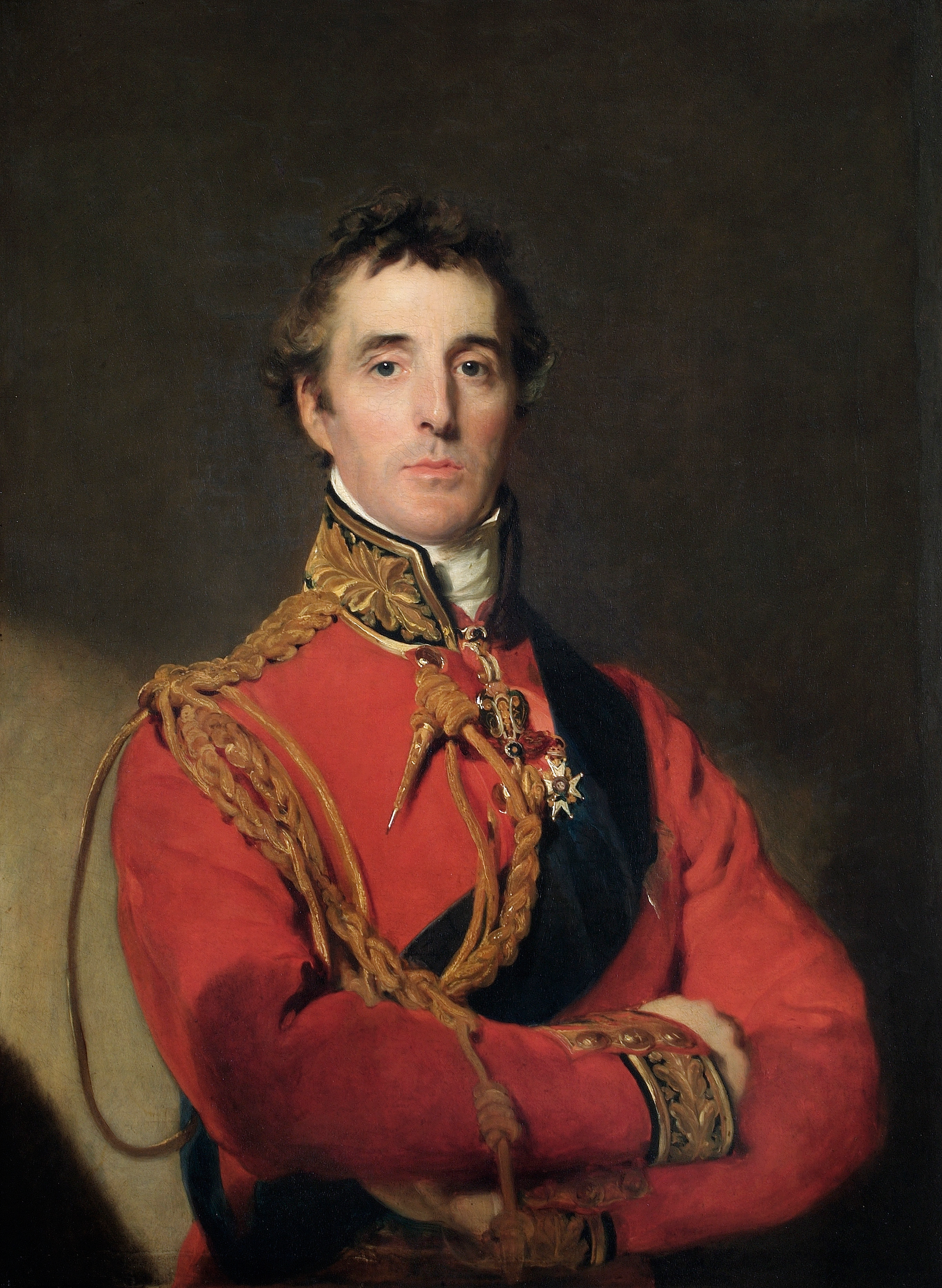
Arthur Wellesley, 1st Duke of Wellington. Major-General Robert Ross.

A significant number of Irish people, of all backgrounds, have served in the forces of the British Crown over the centuries. By the end of the 18th century and the beginning of the 19th century, well over one-third of the military forces of the British Army consisted of Irishmen and Anglo-Irish, because of:-

- the Kingdom of Ireland electing, from the Crown of Ireland Act 1542, to be in a personal union with:
  - House of Tudor
  - from the 1603 Union of the Crowns, with the House of Stuart, and from 1707 the Stuart Kingdom of Great Britain
  - from 1714 the House of Hanover
- from Irish House of Commons approving the acts of Union 1800, through the partitioning Government of Ireland Act 1920, and 1921 Anglo-Irish Treaty, Ireland was a constituent nation of the United Kingdom of Great Britain and Ireland, with the North continuing as part of the United Kingdom of Great Britain and Northern Ireland.
- the traditions of the nobility and landed gentry, which caused them to prefer military service to a career in trade (see: Noblesse oblige)
- economic necessity
- ambition
- family tradition

Irishmen and Anglo-Irish with notable or outstanding overseas careers included:-

- Major-General John Ardagh
- Admiral Matthew Aylmer, 1st Baron Aylmer
- Rear Admiral Francis Beaufort
- William Blakeney, 1st Baron Blakeney
- Brendan Bracken, First Lord of the Admiralty
- Marshal of the Royal Air Force Sir Dermot Boyle
- Lieutenant-General Sir Edward Bulfin
- Lieutenant-General Sir William Butler
- Admiral of the Fleet Sir George Callaghan
- Guy Carleton, 1st Baron Dorchester
- Major General Sir George Colley
- Lieutenant-General Sir Eyre Coote
- Lieutenant-general Alan Cunningham
- Andrew Cunningham, 1st Viscount Cunningham of Hyndhope
- Field Marshal Sir John Dill
- Major-General Beauchamp Doran
- Eric Dorman-Smith
- Major-General Lord Dugan
- Paddy Finucane
- Air Chief Marshal Sir Francis Fogarty
- Field Marshal Viscount Gough
- Rear-Admiral James Macnamara
- Walter Guinness, 1st Baron Moyne
- Major General Sir Charles Gwynn
- Francis Rawdon-Hastings, 1st Marquess of Hastings
- Tom F. Hazell
- Major General Sir William Hickie
- Admiral Charles Johnson
- Sir William Johnson, 1st Baronet
- General Sir Garrett O'Moore Creagh VC
- Brigadier General Richard Kane
- Lieutenant-General Sir Thomas Kelly-Kenny
- Major General Louis Lipsett
- Lieutenant General Henry Lyster VC
- General Sir Bryan Mahon
- Paddy Mayne
- George McElroy
- Lieutenant General Sir Charles MacMorrough Kavanagh
- Field marshal Richard Molesworth, 3rd Viscount Molesworth
- Admiral Sir Edmund Nagle
- George Napier
- Henry Napier
- General Sir William Napier
- Major General Luke O'Connor VC
- Major-General Sir Joseph O'Halloran
- Field Marshal James O'Hara
- Major General David The O'Morchoe
- Admiral Sir Robert Otway
- Admiral of the Fleet Sir Frederick Richards
- Admiral of the Fleet Sir John de Robeck
- Major General Robert Ross
- Admiral Sir Francis Tottenham
- Field Marshal George Wade
- Admiral Sir Peter Warren
- Field Marshal The Duke of Wellington
- Field Marshal Sir Henry Wilson MP
- Field Marshal Lord Wolseley

Others were not born in Ireland, but were born into Irish families, such as:-

- Field Marshal Lord French
- Field Marshal Lord Alanbrooke
- Field Marshal Lord Alexander of Tunis
- General Sir Miles Dempsey
- Brigadier General George Grogan VC
- Field Marshal Lord Gort VC
- General Sir Charles John Stanley Gough VC
- General Sir Hugh Henry Gough, VC
- General Sir John Hackett
- Field Marshal Lord Lambart
- Lieutenant General Sir George Macdonogh
- Admiral Sir Charles Madden
- Colonel Henry McMahon
- Field Marshal Lord Montgomery
- General Sir Richard O'Connor
- General Charles O'Hara
- Major-General Richard Pope-Hennessy
- General Sir Edward Quinan
- Field Marshal Lord Roberts

Victoria Cross recipients:-

The Victoria Cross, the British Crown's highest award for military valour, has been awarded to 188 persons who were born in Ireland or had full Irish parentage. Of these thirty were awarded in the Crimean War, 52 in the Indian Mutiny, and 46 in numerous other British Empire campaigns between 1857 and 1914. In the 20th century, 37 Irish VCs were awarded in the First World War, ten in the Second World War. One has been awarded in Afghanistan in the 21st century to a Belfast-born soldier of the Parachute Regiment.

=== 'Irish' named units of the British Army ===
- What is now the Royal Northumberland Fusiliers was founded in 1674 as "The Irish Regiment"
- The Volunteers of Ireland (1777–82), were renamed the 105th Regiment of Foot
- The Catholic Irish Brigade (1794-1798)
- 4th Royal Irish Dragoon Guards, amalgamated 1922.
- 5th Royal Irish Lancers, disbanded in 1921, reconstituted and amalgamated in 1922.
- 6th (Inniskilling) Dragoons
- 8th King's Royal Irish Hussars, amalgamated 1958.
- 9th Queen's Royal Lancers, amalgamated with the 12th Royal Lancers to form the 9th/12th Royal Lancers in 1960.
- 9th/12th Royal Lancers, amalgamated with the Queen's Royal Lancers to form the Royal Lancers, which includes the 5th Royal Irish Lancers, on 2 May 2015
- 5th Royal Irish Lancers are represented in the new badge for the Royal Lancers regiment by the crossed lancers and the 'red' background colour in the regiment's tactical sign and shoulder patch
- Queen's Royal Irish Hussars, created 1958, amalgamated 1993.
- Queen's Royal Hussars (Queen's Own & Royal Irish). created 1993.
- the badge of the Queen's Royal Hussars includes an Irish harp as its centre-piece, representing the regiment's heritage from the 8th King's Royal Irish Hussars
- North Irish Horse
- South Irish Horse
- Irish Guards

The Royal Irish regiment in the Battle of Amoy in China, 26 August 1841

- Royal Inniskilling Fusiliers, amalgamated 1968
- Royal Irish Fusiliers, amalgamated 1968
- Royal Ulster Rifles, amalgamated 1968
- Royal Irish Rifles, renamed as Royal Ulster Rifles 1921.
- Royal Irish Rangers, created 1968, amalgamated 1992
- Royal Irish Regiment
- Tyneside Irish Brigade, disbanded 1918.
- London Irish Rifles, amalgamated 1992
- Liverpool Irish.
- Royal Irish Artillery, amalgamated 1801.
- Ulster Defence Regiment, amalgamated 1992
- 135th (Limerick) Regiment of Foot 1796 (highest regimental number of any British line regiment.)

=== 'Irish' named 1922 disbanded units of the British Army ===
Following the establishment of the independent Irish Free State in 1922, the six regiments that had their traditional recruiting grounds in the counties of the new state were all disbanded. On 12 June, five regimental Colours were laid up in a ceremony at St George's Hall, Windsor Castle, in the presence of HM King George V. (The South Irish Horse had sent a Regimental engraving because the regiment chose to have its standard remain in St. Patrick's Cathedral, Dublin). The six regiments finally disbanded on 31 July 1922 were:

- Royal Irish Regiment, disbanded 1922
- Connaught Rangers, disbanded 1922
- Leinster Regiment, disbanded 1922
- Royal Munster Fusiliers, disbanded 1922
- Royal Dublin Fusiliers, disbanded 1922
- South Irish Horse, disbanded 1922

Many of the disbanded veterans were subsequently recruited into the Irish Free State's National Army at the onset of the Irish Civil War.

== Canada ==
The Irish Regiment of Canada in the Second World War was the only Canadian Irish unit to fight in any war. It also perpetuates the active service of the 1st Canadian Machine Gun Battalion from the First World War and the indirect service of the 190th (Sportsmen) Battalion, Canadian Expeditionary Force, and the 208th (Canadian Irish) Battalion, CEF. Served as 1915 110th Irish Regiment; 1920 – The Irish Regiment; 1932 – The Irish Regiment of Canada; 1936 – The Irish Regiment of Canada (MG); 1940 – The Irish Regiment of Canada.

The Irish Fusiliers of Canada (Vancouver Regiment) perpetuated the First World War active service of the 29th (Vancouver) Battalion, CEF plus the indirect service of the 121st (Western Irish) Battalion, CEF and the 158th (Duke of Connaught's Own) Battalion, CEF. Served as 1913 – 11th Regiment, Irish Fusiliers of Canada; 1920 – The Irish Fusiliers of Canada; 1936 – The Irish Fusiliers of Canada (Vancouver Regiment); 1946 – 65th Light Anti-Aircraft Regiment (Irish Fusiliers); 1958 – The Irish Fusiliers of Canada (Vancouver Regiment); 1965 – placed on the Supplementary Order of Battle; 2002 – amalgamated with The British Columbia Regiment.

The Irish Canadian Rangers perpetuated the indirect service of the 199th Battalion Duchess of Connaught's Own Irish Rangers, CEF. Served as 1914 – 55th Irish Canadian Rangers; 1920 – The Irish Canadian Rangers; 1936 – disbanded.

The 218th (Edmonton Irish Guards) Battalion, CEF lacks perpetuation. The colonel had Irish ancestry, but the largest group of its men were recent eastern European immigrants from the fringes of the Austro-Hungarian Empire who spoke Ukrainian but would have had Austrian citizenship. This combined with the 211th (Alberta Americans) Battalion, CEF, to form the 8th Battalion, Canadian Railway Troops, which served in France building and maintaining railroads.

=== 'Irish' named units of the Canadian Army ===
- Irish Canadian Rangers
- The Irish Fusiliers of Canada (The Vancouver Regiment)
- The Princess Louise Fusiliers. Although the word "Irish" does not appear in the unit name, the "PLF" are designated as an Irish regiment. The blue Caubeen is an authorized headdress, and a grey hackle (inherited from the Royal Inniskilling Fusiliers) is worn with it and with the beret. Until relatively recently, officers also carried a blackthorn walking stick.
- The Irish Regiment of Canada
- 121st (Western Irish) Battalion, CEF
- 199th (Duchess of Connaught's Own Irish Rangers) Battalion, CEF
- 208th (Canadian Irish) Battalion, CEF
- 218th (Edmonton Irish Guards) Battalion, CEF

== France ==
The Irish Brigade served the Ancien Régime from 1690 to 1792.

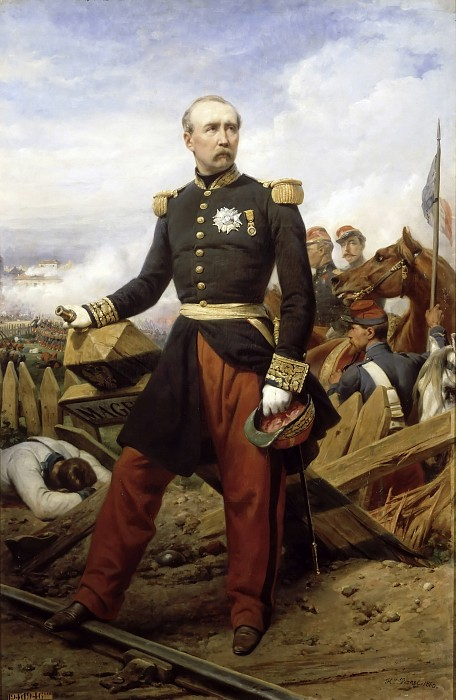
Patrice de MacMahon, duc de Magenta at the Battle of Magenta

Notable Irishmen who served in the French military include

- Patrice de Mac-Mahon, Duke of Magenta – General and President of the Third Republic
- Thomas Arthur, comte de Lally – General, commander in chief of the French Armies in India
- Patrick Sarsfield, 1st Earl of Lucan (1655–1693) - General
- Richard Hennessy - Officer in the Irish Brigade, founder Hennesy Cognac
- Myles Byrne (1780–1862), Napoleon’s Irish Legion, retired under the Bourbon Restoration chef de bataillon.
- Arthur Dillon (1670–1733) – General
- Arthur Dillon (1750–1794) – General and Royalist, victim of the Reign of Terror in 1794.
- Arthur Dillon (1834–1922)
- Henry Dillon – Colonel of the Dillon Regiment and apostate.
- Théobald Dillon General, murdered by his own mutinous troops in 1792 cousin of Arthur Dillon
- Henri Jacques Guillaume Clarke – Marshal of France
- Alexandre d'Alton – General
- Arthur O'Connor - General of Division under Napoleon
- Charles Edward Jennings de Kilmaine
- Edward Stack – General
- Jean Louis Barthélemy O'Donnell - Comte O'Donnell
- John Allen
- John Barrett
- John O'Sullivan
- Walter Stapleton
- Richard Bellew
- James Bartholomew Blackwell
- Toby Bourke
- Piers Butler
- James Butler
- Charles O'Brien
- Daniel O'Brien
- Daniel O'Brien
- Dominic Collins
- Thomas Conway
- William Corbet
- Nicholas Cusack
- John Devoy
- James Lysaght Finegan
- John Fitzgerald
- Michael Rothe
- Richard Grace
- Galloping Hogan
- William O'Brien
- Risteárd Buidhe Kirwan
- Peter Lacy
- Michael Lally
- Gerard Lally
- James Lally
- William Lamport
- William Lawless
- Simon Luttrell
- Isidore Lynch
- Charles MacCarthy
- Daniel MacCarthy Reagh
- Owen MacCarthy
- Roger McElligott
- Richard Butler
- Charles MacCarty
- Muircheartach Óg Ó Súilleabháin
- Daniel O'Brien
- Daniel Charles O'Connell
- Chevalier O'Gorman
- Redmond O'Hanlon
- Henry O'Keane
- James O'Kelly
- Gordon O'Neill
- William O'Shaughnessy
- Richard Francis Talbot
- John Tennant
- Matthias Barnewall
- Richard Warren
- John Nugent

=== 'Irish' named units of the French Army ===
Kingdom of France

- Irish Brigade
  - Régiment de Albemarle (1698–1703) (renamed Régiment de Fitzgerald)
  - Régiment de Athlone
  - Régiment de Berwick (1698–1775) (to Régiment de Clare)
    - 2nd Battalion (1703–1715) (to 1st Battalion and Régiment de Roth)
  - Régiment de Botagh
  - Régiment de Bourke (1698–1715) (renamed Régiment de Wauchop)
  - Régiment de Bulkeley
  - Régiment de Butler (1689–1690)
  - Régiment de Charlemont
  - Régiment de Clare
  - Régiment de Clancarty
  - Régiment de Dillon (1698–1733) (renamed Régiment de Lee)
  - Régiment de Dorrington (1698– ) (renamed Régiment de Roth)
  - Régiment de Dublin
  - Régiment de Feilding (1689–1690)
  - Régiment de Fitzgerald (1703–1708) (renamed Régiment de O'Donnell)
  - Régiment de Fitzgorman
  - Régiment de Galmoy (1698–1715) (to Régiment de Dillon)
  - Régiment de Lally
  - Régiment de Lee (1733– )
  - Régiment de Limerick
  - Régiment de Mountcashel (1698– ) (renamed Régiment de Lee)
  - Régiment de MacElligott
  - Régiment de O'Brien
  - Régiment de O'Donnell (1708–1715) (to Régiment de Clare)
  - Régiment de Roscommon
  - Régiment de Roth (or Rooth) (renamed Régiment de Walsh)
  - Régiment de Walsh (renamed from Régiment de Roth)
  - Régiment de Wauchop (1715) (to Spain)
  - Fitzjame's Horse
  - Galmoy's Horse
  - Kilmallock's Dragoons
  - O'Gara's Dragoons
  - Nugent's Horse (renamed Fitzjames' Horse)
  - Sheldon's Horse (1698– ) (renamed Nigent's Horse)

First French Empire

- Irish Legion (1803–1815)

== Germany ==
=== Bavaria ===
During the War of the Spanish Succession Irishmen formed 8% of the Bavarian officer corps. The Elector of Bavaria, Maximilian, was also governor of Spanish Netherlands and nominated Irish officers to Walloon regiments.

=== Unified Germany ===
- Baron George Von Scheffler, Gardes du Corps (Prussia) 1914–18

In the First World War, Imperial Germany tried with the help of Roger Casement to recruit an "Irish Brigade" from Irish-born prisoners of war who had served in the British Army. By 1916 only 52 men had volunteered, and the plan was abandoned.

In the Second World War an even smaller number volunteered to join the Wehrmacht of Nazi Germany and were trained at Friesack Camp. Separately some IRA sympathisers planned certain operations with the Abwehr that were generally unsuccessful.

== India ==
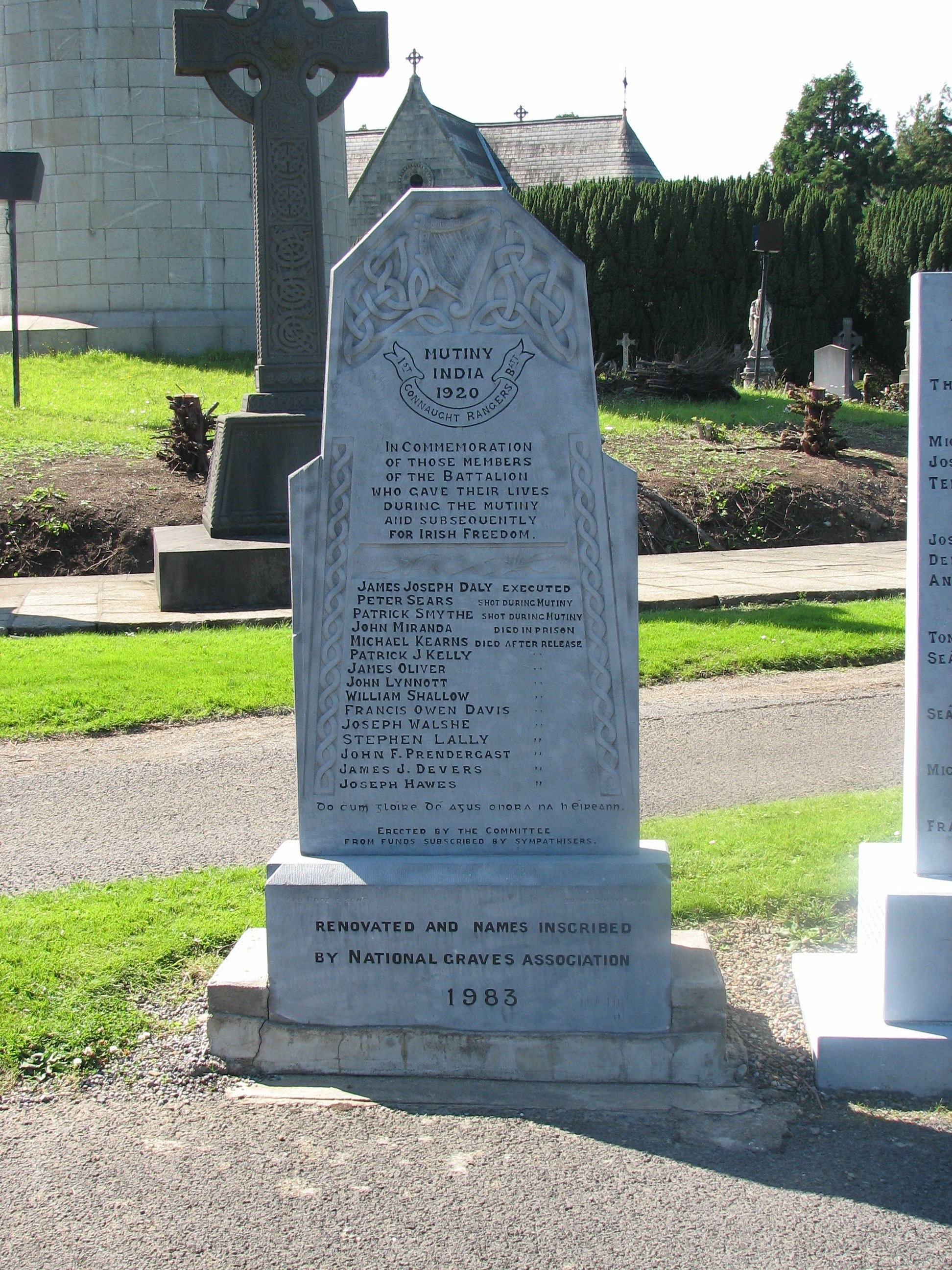
Dublin memorial honouring sacrifice of some Connaught Rangers for their 1920 Mutiny in India to protest martial law in Ireland

- Connaught Rangers, disbanded 1922
- Leinster Regiment, disbanded 1922
- Royal Dublin Fusiliers, disbanded 1922
- Royal Irish Fusiliers
- Royal Irish Regiment, disbanded 1922
- Royal Munster Fusiliers, disbanded 1922

== Latin America ==
Admiral William Brown.

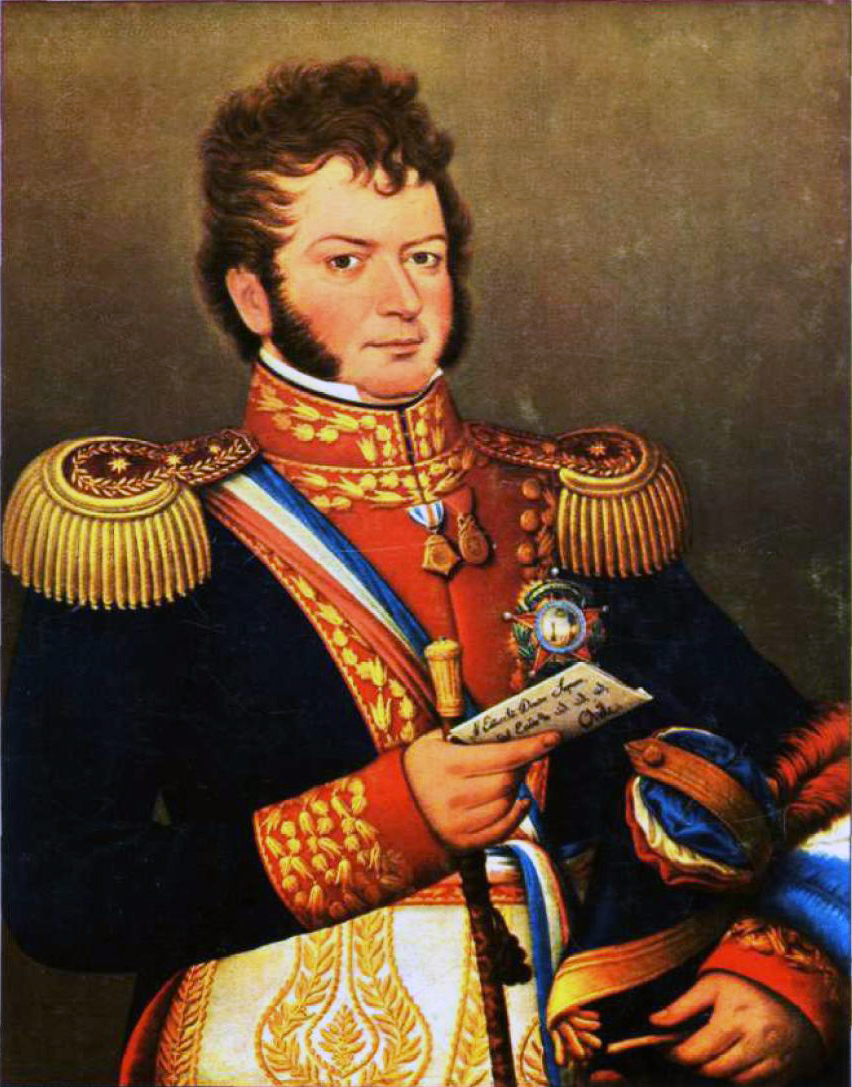
Bernardo O'Higgins

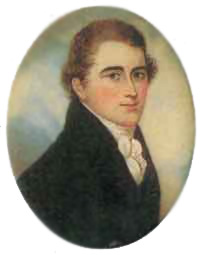
Daniel Florence O'Leary

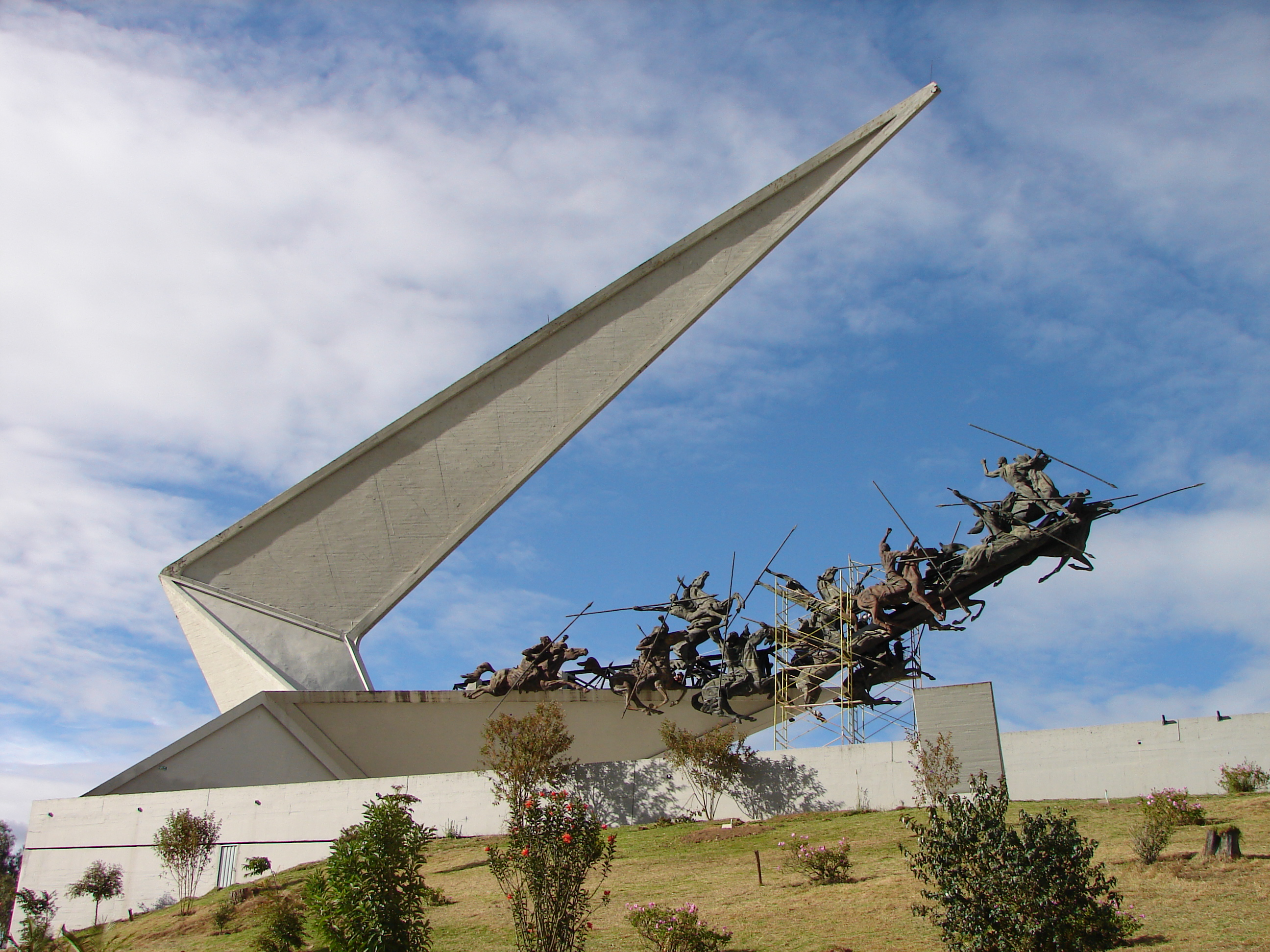
Monument of the Battle of Vargas Swamp

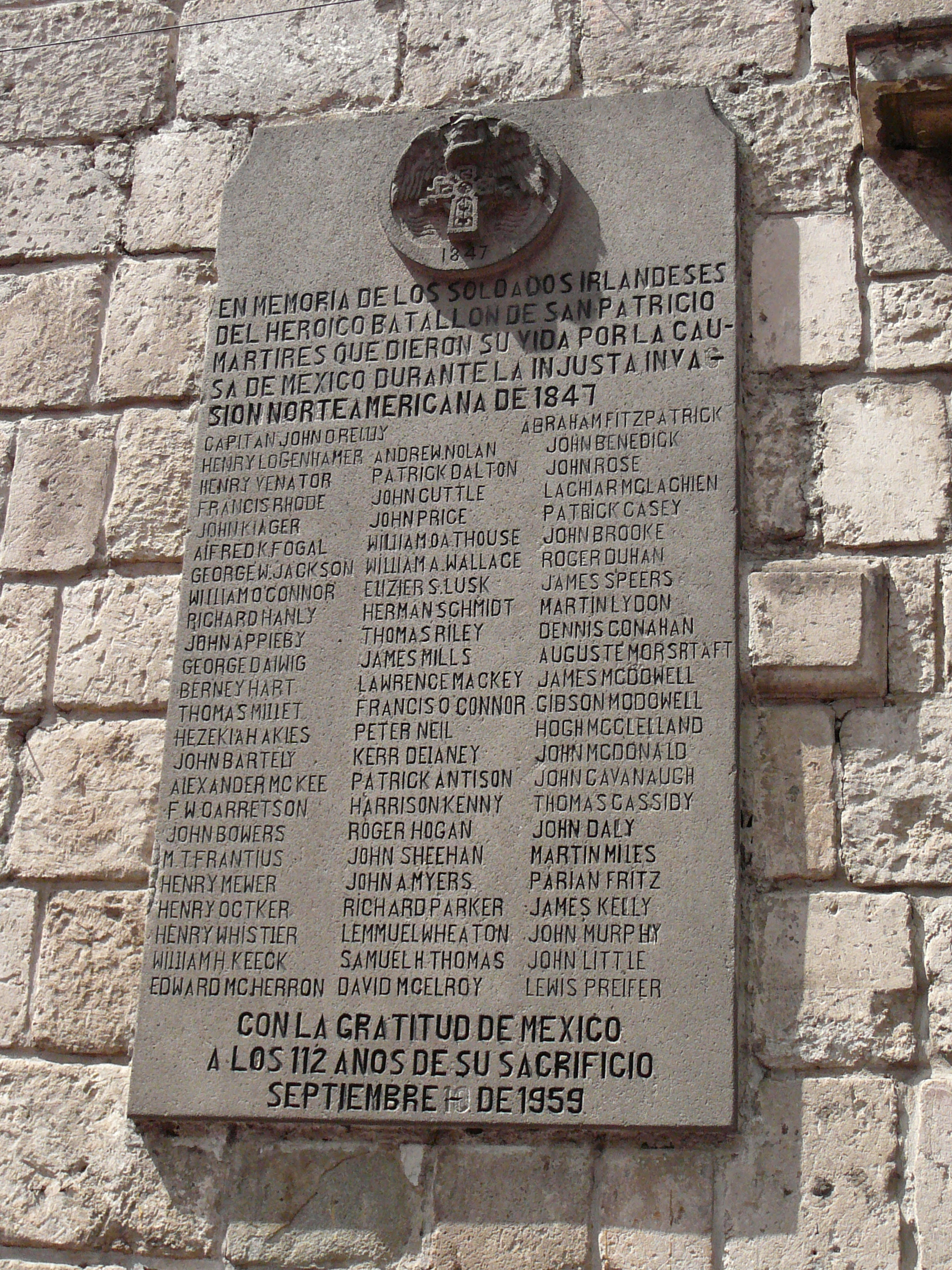
Commemorative plaque of Saint Patrick's Battalion at Plaza San Jacinto, San Ángel district of Mexico City

The presence and impact of the Irish in Latin America dates back to the time of Spanish rule, when in different historical periods they migrated to the Iberian Peninsula and from there to the American continent, enlisted in the colonization, trade, army and administration companies.

The greatest concentration and contributions occurred during the emancipation wars from Spanish rule. The researcher Matthew Brown wrote about the importance and impact, for out of some 6,808 Europeans, the Irish represented 48%; equivalent to 3,000 Irish who fought to give freedom to Venezuela, Colombia. Ecuador, Peru and Bolivia. The majority would have come enlisted in the Irish Legion of Simon Bolivar Army.

=== Events ===
- Spanish American wars of independence (1811–26)
- Irish and German Mercenary Soldiers' Revolt – Brazil 1828
- USA intervention in Mexico (1846–48)

=== People ===
- William Aylmer– Aide-de-camp to Mariano Montilla in Venezuela
- John Blossett- led the second British Legion to aid Simon Bolivar in the wars of independence against Spain.
- William Brown (admiral) – "Father of the Argentine Navy"
- Peter (Pedro) Campbell – Founder of the Uruguayan Navy (see Pedro Campbell (in Spanish) for detailed information.)
- Charles Chamberlain, Irish colonel who was attached to the Staff of General Simon Bolivar. Chamberlain severely wounded in the battle of Unare Barracks took refuge with his wife Eulalia Ramos in Barcelona (Venezuela). In march of 1817 the Royalist Army siege Barcelona. The town's entire population took refuge in the Convent of San Francisco transformed in fortress by Simon Bolivar. On 7 April 1817 Chamberlain died in combat and his wife Eulalia Ramos attempted to move his body before being captured and beaten by a Spanish officer. He proposed that she gives up the independence cause in exchange for remaining alive, but she quickly took his gun and shot him in the chest, killing him instantly, while shouting "Viva la Patria -- mueran los tiranos". Immediately, the other Spaniards pounce on her, killing her with their bayonets, while the Fortress fell into the hands of the royalist forces.
- John Devereux (army officer) – Commander of the Irish Legion in Venezuela and New Granada.
- Antonio Donovan (1849–1897) – General in Argentina (text in Spanish)
- Lorenzo Fitzgerald - Spanish General and last Governor of Guayana
- William Ferguson (1800–1828) – Aide-de-camp to General Simon Bolívar, involved in the struggle for independence of Venezuela, New Granada and Peru. On 28 September 1828 at Santafe de Bogotá, Ferguson was mistaken by conspirators for Bolívar, and shot in the back and mortally wounded while walking down the street. Honoured with a public funeral his remains were buried at the cathedral of Bogotá, an unusual honour for a Protestant.
- Rupert Hand – Cavalry colonel that assassinated general José María Córdova. Governor of El Choco (Colombia)
- Juan MacKenna – Founder of the Military Corps of Engineers of the Chilean Army.
- Juan Garland – military engineer in the service of Spain and active in Chile.
- William Lamport – nicknamed El Zorro, The Fox, due to his exploits in Mexico
- Patrick Lynch – Capitán de Milicias in Río de la Plata
- Estanislao Lynch – Argentine officer in the Army of the Andes
- Patricio Lynch – Admiral of the Chilean navy
- Joseph Mires- mathematician that founded the math Academy of Caracas (1808) as captain of the Regiment of the Queen, but soon turned to the cause of Venezuelan Patriots. As aid de camp of Marshal Antonio José de Sucre he will face battles, prison and exile until to be fired in Guayaquil, Ecuador, in 1829.
- Santiago Mariño Fitzgerald – Venezuelan born of an Irish mother descent, aide de camp to Simón Bolívar in Venezuela
- José Trinidad Morán- Venezuelan military man of an Irish father descent. Obtained Peruvian nationality for his services rendered in the war of independence. Participated in the liberation campaigns of Ecuador, Peru and Bolivia
- Richard Murphy O'Leary – general surgeon, aide de camp to Simón Bolívar in Venezuela
- John Thomond O'Brien – Aide-de-camp to general José de San Martín.
- Jorge O'Brien – Captain of the Chilean Navy during the Chilean War of Independence.
- Francis O'Connor – officer in the Irish Legion of Simon Bolivar, Aide de camp to Antonio Jose de Sucre in Peru, Minister of War in Bolivia.
- Morgan O'Connell– Aide-de-camp to general Simon Bolivar in Venezuela
- Hugh O'Conor- Military governor of northern Mexico.
- Demetrio O'Daly (general) – Puerto Rican delegate to the Spanish Cortes
- Juan O'Donojú - Lieutenant General in the service of Spain and last viceroy of New Spain.
- Ricardo O'Donovan- officer of the Peruvian army of Irish ancestors who died in combat in the battle of Arica
- Ambrosio O'Higgins – Colonial administrator and military governor of Chile (1788–1796), father of Bernardo O'Higgins
- Bernardo O'Higgins – First Chilean head of state (Supreme Director, 1817–23), commanded the forces that won independence from Spain.
- Daniel Florencio O'Leary – aide de camp to Simón Bolívar in Venezuela
- Tomás O'Neille - governor of San Andres island
- Arturo O'Neill de Tyrone y O'Kelly (1736–1814) - Spanish Army officer and colonial governor of Florida and Yucatán.
- Sebastián Kindelán y O'Regan - governor of East Florida, Santo Domingo and Cuba.
- Alexander O'Reilly – General, "Father of the Puerto Rican Militia"
- Diego O'Reilly – General, led royalist troops into the Battle of Pasco (1820), but was defeated by General Arenales using thick snowfall to launch a surprise attack.
- Robert Otway – Materially supported the Independence of Brazil
- Robert Piggot – First Irish commander of 1st Venezuelan Rifles of Bolivar Army
- Middleton Power – aide de camp to Simón Bolívar in Venezuela
- John Riley Comandante of the Saint Patrick's Battalion in the American-Mexican War
- James Rooke – at command of British Legions was seriously wounded in the Battle of Vargas Swamp (Colombia)
- Arthur Sandes – Second Irish commander of 1st Venezuelan Rifles of Bolivar Army
- Thomas Charles Wright - Irish-born naval admiral. He was the founding-father of the Ecuadorian Navy, and a general in Bolívar's army.
- James Towers English – Irish commander of British Legions forces in the Spanish American wars of independence.
- Pedro Dartnell – Descendant of Irish, Commander-in-Chief of the Chilean Army. President of the Provisional Government Junta of 1925

=== 'Irish' named units in Latin America ===
- 1st Regiment Venezuelan Rifles – Irish regiment that took part in the Venezuelan War of Independence.
- Saint Patrick's Battalion – Irish American battalion that deserted and fought for Mexico in the Mexican–American War

== Papal States ==
The Irish that went to fight for the Papal States were not professional soldiers but an entirely voluntary force (a few were members of Cork Constabulary) that was raised with a sole purpose, to defend Pope Pius IX. By 1860 the ability of foreign countries to recruit in Ireland and Great Britain was frowned upon but still technically possible. It wouldn't be outlawed for another ten years with the Foreign Enlistment Act. Despite being promised that they would serve in a single brigade they were scattered among other brigades with men from other European Catholic countries. They were poorly clothed and equipped but fought with gallantry. The first battle they played a part in was Perugia where after most of the Papal force surrendered the Irish continued to fight. The next battle where the Irish fought was Spoleto. 300 Irish volunteers under Myles O'Reilly held off 2,500 veteran Piedmontese, including Victor Emmanuel's elite light infantry the Bersaglieri for fourteen hours including vicious hand-to-hand fighting. The next significant engagement was the Battle of Castelfidardo where 150 Irishmen fought. The war ended shortly after this when the outnumbered and out-equipped Papal army was ordered by Pius to lay down their arms. Apart from Myles O'Reilly this was the first military experience of Myles Keogh who later on fought with distinction during the US Civil War and after in the United States Cavalry until he fell at the Battle of Little Bighorn in 1876.

== Portugal ==
Kingdom of Portugal

- Marshal William Beresford, 1st Viscount Beresford; head of the Portuguese army from 1809 to 1820.

== Russia ==
The most recognised and outstanding Irishman to serve in the Russian Army was Peter Lacy from Bruff, County Limerick, who died in 1751 while governor of Livonia. Lacy's daughter married another Irish man from Limerick, General George Browne who became a Russian general and their son Johann Georg von Browne also rose to the rank of general in Russia. Count John O'Rourke was a prominent military theorist during the time of Catherine the Great. O'Rourke and his brother Cornelius joined the Russian Army. Cornelius married a niece of Lacy. John O'Rourke's son Joseph Cornelius O'Rourke rose to the rank of lieutenant general during the Napoleonic period. Another prominent descendant Eduard Alexander Ladislaus Graf (Count) O'Rourke became the bishop of Gdańsk in the inter-war years and died an exile in Rome in 1943.

- Field Marshal Count Peter von Lacy

== Sweden ==
Irish military involvement in the Swedish army was neither happy nor successful. At the beginning of the seventeenth century about 6,000 men were shipped out of Ulster for the security of the plantation and sent to Sweden. They were especially unhappy fighting for a Lutheran power. Some Irish friars disguised themselves as soldiers and moved among the men encouraging them to desert to Catholic powers. The men then left Swedish service and most joined the army of Poland. After this incident Gustavus Adolphus refused to accept any large scale recruitment of Irishmen considering them untrustworthy. However a small number went to serve in the officer corps. The most prominent of these was Hugh Hamilton, 1st Viscount of Glenawly. Two of his nephews also entered Swedish service.

== South Africa ==
Some Irish fought in British ranks in various colonial wars. Some Irish were also among the 1820 settlers, a famous example is the Rorke family whose descendants went on to set up Rorkes Drift. Battle of Rorkes Drift

=== Disbanded 'Irish' named units in South Africa ===
- Cape Town Irish Volunteer Rifles
- Irish Boer commandos
  - Irish Transvaal Brigade
  - 2nd Irish Brigade

=== 'Irish' named units in South Africa ===
- South African Irish Regiment Formed in 1914

== Spain ==
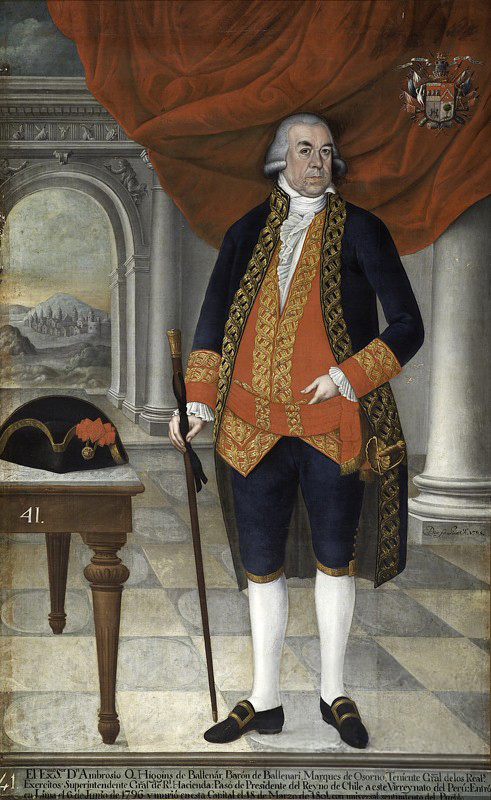
Ambrosio O'Higgins, 1st Marquess of Osorno, governor of Chile, Viceroy of Peru, father of Bernardo O'Higgins, whom he never met.

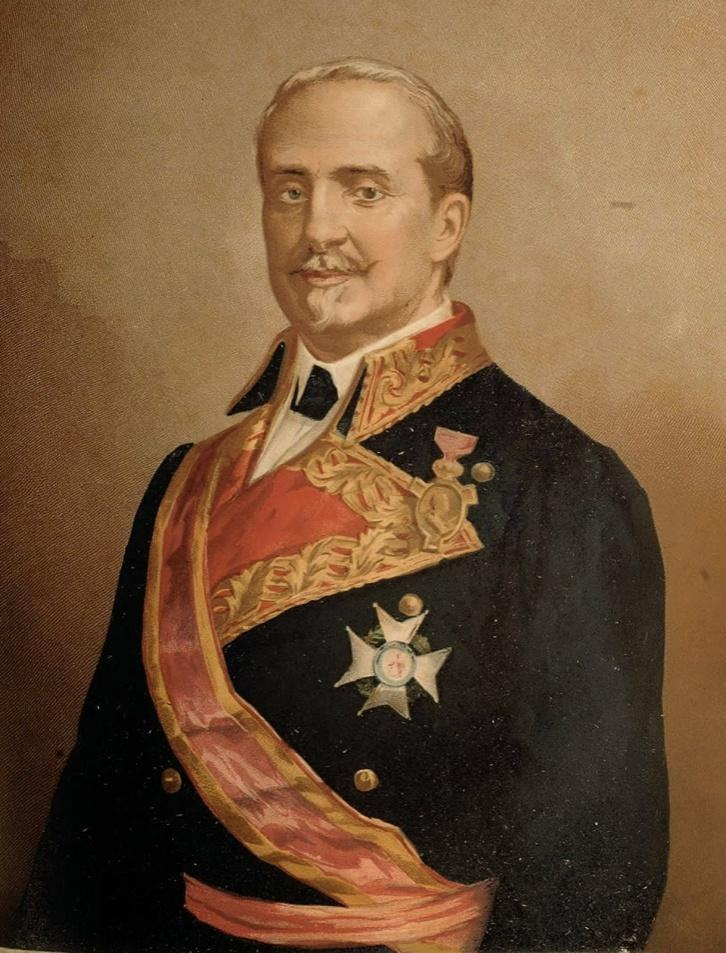
Leopoldo O'Donnell, 1st Duke of Tetuán

The first major military exodus of Irishmen to Spain happened after the failure of the Second Desmond Rebellion in 1583. At least 200 Irish were part of the Armada in 1588. About the same time, in 1587, 600 Irishmen under the command of Sir William Stanley sent to aid the Dutch in their war with Spain switched sides with their commander and served Spain.
The next great exodus of Irishmen to serve in the armies occurred after the Siege of Kinsale. An Irish regiment was formed in 1605 and Colonel Henry O'Neill was placed at its head. Five other Irish regiments were formed between 1632 and 1646 and were placed under the command of The Earl of Tyrconnell, Owen Roe O'Neill, Thomas Preston, Patrick FitzGerald and John Murphy. Later they were joined by Irishmen who had served in the army of Henri de Bourbon and Charles IV. The difficulties that plagued them at home were carried to the continent when O'Donnells refused to serve under O'Neills and tension existed between the Old English and the Old Irish. This was especially evident in tensions between O'Neill and Preston.
After the Cromwellian conquest of Ireland there was a fresh exodus of men which suited the English as it ensured that men of fighting age would be engaged in wars on the continent. In one incident in 1653 during the Siege of Girona (Principality of Catalonia) some of the Irish defenders deserted and joined the French under de Bellefonds. With the restoration of Charles II in 1660 most of the remaining Irish chose to return to Ireland. Two regiments remained under the command of the O'Neills and Hugh Balldearg O'Donnell.
With the War of Succession in 1701 Irish regiments were reformed mostly via France. Two dragoon regiments were formed and named after their founders, O'Mahony (1703) and Crofton (1705). Four infantry regiments were formed between 1702 and 1718 while a fifth transferred from French service in 1715. They were named:

- Regimento de Infantería de Hibernia (1705– )
- Regimento de Infantería de Irlanda (1702– )
- Regimento de Infantería de Limerick (1718– )
- Regimento de Infantería de Ultonia (Ulster) (1718– )
- Regimento de Infantería de Wauchop (1715– )
- Regimento de Infantería de Waterford (1718– )

There was a certain amount of reorganisation, so the Regimento de Infantería de Waterford became the second battalion of Irlanda in 1733. When Charles, Duke of Parma (future Charles II) became King of Naples and Sicily he took Regimento de Infantería de Limerick with him into Neapolitan service, where it was known as Regimento del Rey. The remaining regiments remained in Spanish service and wore red uniforms until 1802, when they changed to light blue in common with the remainder of the Spanish army.

Notable commanders

- Donal Cam O'Sullivan Beare
- Hugh Dubh O'Neill
- Shane O'Neill (son of Hugh)
- Field Marshal Alejandro O'Reilly
- Arturo O'Neill
- Juan O'Neylle
- Luis de Lacy
- Juan O'Donojú
- Joaquín Blake y Joyes
- Ricardo Wall
- Leopoldo O'Donnell y Jorris
- Carlos Manuel O'Donnell y Anhetan
- Enrique O'Donnell, Conde de La Bisbal
- Joseph O'Donnell Jr.
- Joseph O'Donnell Sr.
- Charles Wogan
- Gonzalo O'Farrill
- Garret Barry
- Balthazar Bourke
- Redmond Burke
- William Burke
- Tomás Burke
- Dominic Collins
- Piers Butler
- Juan Garland
- Richard Grace
- Murrough O'Brien
- William Lamport
- Patrick Lawless
- Juan Mackenna
- Owen Roe O'Neill
- Alejandro O'Reilly
- Bernardo O'Connor
- John Patrick O'Gara
- Joseph O'Lawlor
- Hugh Dubh O'Neill
- Philip O'Sullivan Beare
- John Sherlock
- Shane O'Neill
- Willaim Walsh
- William Talbot
- Thomas Preston
- Richard Grace

Spanish Civil War (1936–1939)

- Frank Ryan
- Eoin O'Duffy
- Irish Brigade (Spanish Civil War)
- Irish Socialist Volunteers

== United States ==
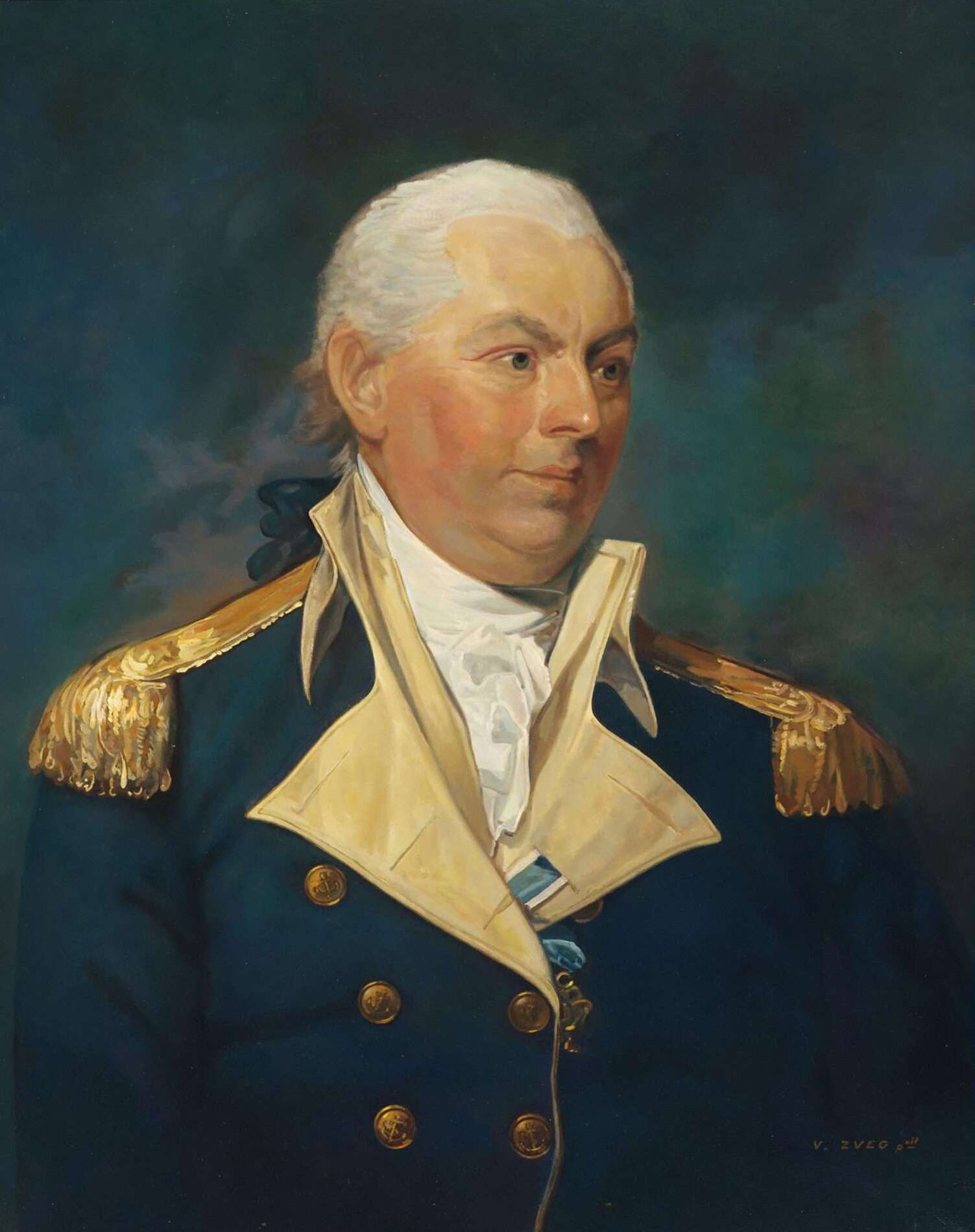
Commodore John Barry by Gilbert Stuart

Irish have been fighting in the United States and British North America all the way back to the mid-1600s mostly in Virginia, Pennsylvania, and the Carolinas. Florence O’Sullivan a captain who was an early settler in South Carolina who was involved in much of the fighting against the Spanish and natives Sullivans Island. In the 1700s Irish surnames could be found on various colonial American records especially in Provincial military units that contained large amounts of troops born in Ireland even Washington's force at the battle of fort necessity the muster roll is found online. An example being frontiersman Samuel Brady. And earlier Thomas Dongan. Irish involvement only heightened with the American revolution and later in the mid-1800s when most of the Irish immigrants came to the United States.

- Hercules Mooney
- Daniel Sullivan
- Edward Hand
- Thomas Hickey
- Jeremiah O’Brien
- Timothy Murphy (sniper)
- John Sullivan (general) revolutionary war general
- Richard Butler (general)
- Stephen Watts Kearny
- Thomas MacDonough
- John Coffee
- Presley Neville O’Bannon
- Michael Corcoran, General in the Union Army
- Thomas Francis Meagher
- Commodore John Barry "Father of the American Navy"
- Myles Walter Keogh
- Edward Stack
- Richard Montgomery
- Philip Sheridan
- James Shields (Brig. Gen. USA) Planned defeat of General Thomas "Stonewall" Jackson at Kernstown in 1862

=== Confederate States of America ===
- William M. Browne
- Patrick Cleburne
- Richard W. Dowling
- Joseph Finegan
- James Hagan (Confederate colonel)
- Walter P. Lane
- Patrick T. Moore
- John Mitchel
- Thomas Francis Bourke

=== 'Irish' named units in the United States ===
Many of these units have their origins from the participation of Irish-Americans in the American Civil War.

Incomplete

American Revolution

Loyalists

  - Loyal Irish Volunteers
  - 2nd American Regiment (Volunteers of Ireland) later the 105th Regiment of Foot (British Army)
- John Connolly

American Civil War

Union Army

- 69th Pennsylvania Infantry (formerly 2nd California) ("The Rock of Erin")
- 9th Connecticut Infantry
- 7th Missouri Infantry Regiment
- 8th Missouri Infantry Regiment
- 30th Missouri Infantry Regiment ("Shamrock Regiment")
- 9th Massachusetts Volunteer Infantry
- 10th Ohio Volunteer Infantry
- 10th Tennessee Volunteer Infantry (formerly 1st Middle Tennessee Volunteer Infantry)
- 23rd Illinois Volunteer Infantry
- 90th Illinois Infantry Regiment ("Irish Legion" or "Second Irish")
- 28th Massachusetts Infantry
- 30th Missouri Volunteer Infantry
- 35th Indiana Volunteer Infantry ("1st Irish")
- 37th New York Volunteer Infantry ("The Irish Rifles")
- 42nd New York Volunteer Infantry ("Tammany Jackson Guard")
- 63rd New York Volunteer Infantry
- 69th New York Volunteer Infantry ("Fighting 69th"). Currently an Army National Guard battalion that maintains Irish traditions
- 88th New York Volunteer Infantry
- 99th New York Volunteer Infantry
- 116th Pennsylvania Volunteer Infantry
- 164th New York Volunteer Infantry ("Corcoran's Irish Zouaves")
- Irish Brigade (US)

Confederate Army

- 1st Irish Battalion, Virginia Infantry Regulars
- 2nd Tennessee Volunteer Infantry ("Irish")
- 6th Louisiana Volunteer Infantry ("Irish Brigade")
- 9th Georgia Cavalry
- 10th Tennessee Volunteer Infantry ("Sons of Erin")
- Louisiana Tigers
- Company E, 33rd Virginia Infantry, Stonewall Brigade ("Emerald Guards")
- McMillan Guards, Company K, 24th Georgia Infantry
- Jeff Davis Guard, Company F, 1st Texas Heavy Artillery
- Company I, 8th Alabama Volunteer Infantry ("Emerald Guards")
- Cobb's Legion (Georgia Legion)
- 24th Georgia Infantry Regiment
- Company D, 18th Arkansas Infantry Regiment, Marmaduke's ("The Shamrock Guards")

Modern era

- Admiral William M. Callaghan
- Michael Mullen, Chairman of the Joint Chiefs of Staff 2007–11
- Martin Dempsey, Chairman of the Joint Chiefs of Staff 2011-15

== See also ==
- Flight of the Wild Geese
- Foreign enlistment in the American Civil War
- Loyalist (American Revolution)
