= Robert Rothe =

Irish antiquarian

- Born: 28 April 1550
- Died: 18 December 1622 (aged 72)
- Occupation: Antiquarian

Robert Rothe (28 April 1550 – 18 December 1622) was an Irish antiquarian.

== Biography ==
Rothe was born on 28 April 1550, was eldest son of David Rothe, ‘sovereign’ of Kilkenny in 1541, and commissioner for the county in 1558, by his wife Anstace, daughter of Patrick Archer of Kilkenny. David Rothe, Bishop of Ossory, was his first cousin, and Michael Rothe, the general, was lineally descended from the bishop's father. Robert was a Dublin barrister, and at an early age became standing counsel and agent to his kinsman, Thomas Butler, tenth earl of Ormonde. In 1574, he went to London on Ormonde's business and obtained for himself a confirmation of arms from William Dethick, York herald. He was elected M.P. for the county of Kilkenny in 1585. He was exempted in 1587 from the composition levied on the county; and ‘in consideration of his services and great losses in the time of the late rebellion [of Tyrone in 1598], and to encourage him in his loyalty,’ he was granted by Queen Elizabeth in 1602 part of the possessions of the priory of Kells. The grant was confirmed in 1607.

In the charter creating Kilkenny a city (1609) he is named as first alderman and recorder. He was also the first mayor. Besides his residence in the city of Kilkenny, he had places at Kilcreene and Tullaghmaine. At the latter he built bridges, and left directions for keeping them in repair. He was elected a bencher of the King's Inns, Dublin, and served as treasurer in 1620. He died on 18 December 1622, in his seventy-third year.

Rothe was author of two valuable historical works, still remaining in manuscript, viz.: 1. ‘A Register containing the Pedigree of the Honourable Thomas, late Earl of Ormond and Ossory, and of his ancestors and cousins, both lineal and collateral, as well since the Conquest as before. … Collected and gathered out of sundry Records and evidences. … in 1616.’ This manuscript, numbered F. 3. 16. No. 13 in Trinity College Library, Dublin, revised by the writer's grandson, Sir Robert Rothe, was extensively used by Carte in his ‘Life of Ormond.’ A copy is in the possession of The O'Conor Don (Hist. MSS. Comm. 2nd Rep. p. 224). 2. ‘A Register or Breviat of the Antiquities and Statuts of the towne of Kilkenny, with other antiquities collected by me, Robert Rothe, esquier, as well out of severall books, charters, evidences, and rolls,’ &c., the earliest compilation extant in connection with local Irish history. It is fully described by Mr. J. T. Gilbert, of the Public Record Office, Dublin, in the Second Report of the Historical Manuscripts Commission, 1871, pp. 257–263. It is at present in the library of the Royal Irish Academy.

A third evidence of Rothe's antiquarian and genealogical learning is his will, which covers twenty-nine sheets of parchment, and sets out the limitations in descent of his estate to the sixteenth degree. In it he directs the building of a chapel at Tullaghmaine, the maintenance of the Rothe chapel at St. Mary's Church, Kilkenny, and the enlargement of the poorhouse built by his grandfather, Robert Rothe (d. 1543), in the city of Kilkenny.

Rothe was twice married: first, to Margaret, daughter of Fowke Comerford of Callan, and sister of Gerald Comerford, M.P. for Callan in 1584, attorney-general, and baron of the court of exchequer 1604, by whom he had three sons—David, Richard, and Piers—and four daughters. By his second wife, Margaret Archer, he had no issue.

Rothe's eldest son, David, was father of Sir Robert Rothe (d. 1664), who was knighted by the lord-lieutenant, Ormonde, in 1648–9, and forfeited his estates in Kilkenny on Cromwell's reduction of Ireland, but was restored by Charles II in 1663. Sir Robert's grandson, Robert Rothe of Tullaghmaine, became lieutenant-colonel in Lord Mountcashel's regiment; he afterwards entered the French service, and was killed in Flanders in 1709, when the senior branch of the Rothe family became extinct.

Rothe's second son, Richard, was grandfather of William Rothe or Routh, a captain in the French service, who was killed in Flanders in August 1710. This Captain Rothe was father of Bernard Routh, the jesuit.
