= Manus O'Donnell (disambiguation) =

Manus O'Donnell was the ruler of Tyrconnell from 1537 to 1555.

Manus O'Donnell or Manus O'Donell may also refer to:

- Manus O'Donnell (died 1600), brother of Hugh Roe O'Donnell
- Manus O'Donell, 18th-century nobleman
