= Lamport =

Lamport may refer to:

== Places ==
- Lamport, Buckinghamshire, England, a former hamlet
- Lamport, Northamptonshire, England, a village and civil parish

== Other uses ==
- Lamport (surname)
- Lamport Hall, Lamport, Northamptonshire, a Grade I Listed House
- Lamport railway station, Northamptonshire
- Lamport Stadium, an arena in Toronto, Canada

== See also ==
- Lamport and Holt, a defunct UK merchant shipping line
- Lampart (disambiguation)
