= Lampart =

Lampart may refer to:

== People ==
- Dawid Lampart (born 1990), Polish motorcycle speedway rider
- Wiktor Lampart (born 2001), Polish international speedway rider
- William Lamport or Lampart (1611/1615–1659), Irish Catholic adventurer

== Other uses ==
- Lampart FC, a Hungarian football club based in Budapest
- PZL.48 Lampart, a Polish heavy fighter-bomber design that was never manufactured due to the outbreak of World War II
- Blaufränkisch, a variety of grape also known as Lampart

== See also ==
- Lamport (disambiguation)
