= Arthur Sandes =

Irish commanding officer

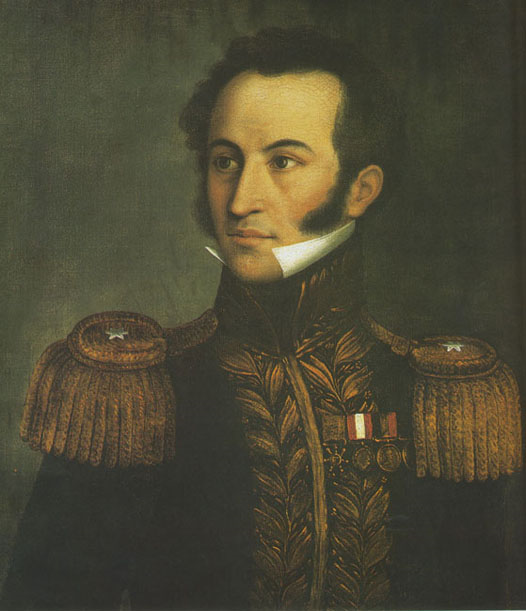
- Portrait of Sandes c. 1826
- Born: 1793; County Kerry, Ireland
- Died: 6 September 1832 (aged 38–39); Cuenca, Ecuador
- Military career
- Allegiance: United Kingdom; Venezuela; Colombia
- Branch: Army
- Service years: c. 1800s-1832
- Rank: Lieutenant-colonel (Venezuela); Brigadier-general (Gran Colombia)
- Unit: British Legions
- Commands: 1st Venezuelan Rifles
- Conflicts: Napoleonic Wars; Hundred Days; Battle of Waterloo; Colombian War of Independence; Battle of Boyacá; Battle of Carabobo; Campaigns of the South; Peruvian War of Independence; Battle of Corpahuaico; Gran Colombia–Peru War; Battle of Tarqui

Arthur Sandes (1793 in Kerry – 6 September 1832 in Cuenca, Ecuador) was the commanding officer of the 1st Venezuelan Rifles of the British Legions in the Spanish American wars of independence. He joined Legions as a lieutenant after service in a logistics role in the British Army and fought in many of Simón Bolívar's campaign. He received rapid promotion for distinguished service and was placed in command of his unit in 1819. In 1823 he became a brigadier-general and in the peace that followed the 1829 Battle of Tarqui became governor of Azuay Province in Ecuador.

== Early life ==
Sandes was born in Glenfield, County Kerry, Ireland, in 1793. Like all five of his brothers he joined the British Army, Sandes served with the commissariat, which provided logistical support to the army in the field. Sandes was present at the 1815 Battle of Waterloo but left the army during the peace that followed the Hundred Days.

== Spanish American wars of independence ==
A fellow veteran, Gustavus Hippisley, raised volunteers to fight for the revolutionaries in the Spanish American wars of independence. Sandes joined the British Legions and served with the forces of Simón Bolívar in the Orinoco valley, in modern Venezuela. Sandes helped to raise and train units of local people before joining the 1st Venezuelan Rifles, of European volunteers, as a lieutenant. Sandes rose quickly in rank to captain and, in October 1818, was promoted to major by Bolívar.

When the 1st Venezuelan Rifle' commanding officer, Colonel Robert Piggott departed for the West Indies in 1819 Sandes was left in command of the unit which became known as Sandes's Rifles. Sandes and his men joined Bolívar in crossing the Andes into the Viceroyalty of New Granada. He won notice for his distinguished actions at the July Battle of Gameza and Topaga, during which he was wounded, and, for leading an assault on Spanish artillery during the 7 August 1819 Battle of Boyacá, won promotion to lieutenant-colonel. In 1820 Sandes was on detached service along the Magdalena River and in the jungle of the Guajira Peninsula. Sandes was again noted for his actions in the 24 June 1821 Battle of Carabobo, being mentioned in dispatches and receiving promotion to the acting rank of colonel.

Sandes and his men were posted to Ecuador, enduring a 1,500 miles (2,400 km) march. Sandes fought in the 7 April 1822 Battle of Bomboná, part of the Campaigns of the South, after which the unit became known as the "Rifles of Bomboná: First of the Guard". Sandes was confirmed in the rank of colonel in September 1822 and in November led his men to put down a Royalist uprising on the Colombian border. He rejoined Bolívar at Lima, Peru, in May 1823 and went on to serve under Antonio José de Sucre on campaign in the Andes. During the Battle of Corpahuaico Sandes's Rifles formed a rearguard for the rest of the army as it withdrew. They held a ravine against repeated attacks but suffered heavy casualties. Sandes was rewarded with promotion to the rank of brigadier-general and the rifles awarded the battle honour "Liberators of Peru".

Sandes and others loyal to Bolívar was briefly detained during the January 1827 rebellion by the Nueva Granadino faction of the army in Lima. Returning to Colombia he was appointed to command the Guayaquil district and fought in the 27 February 1829 victory over the invading Peruvian forces at the Battle of Tarqui. In the peace that followed he served as governor of Azuay Province in Ecuador and established a number of schools. He died at Cuenca on 6 September 1832 following a long illness and was buried at the city's Carmelite convent.
