= USS Stack =

Benham-class destroyer

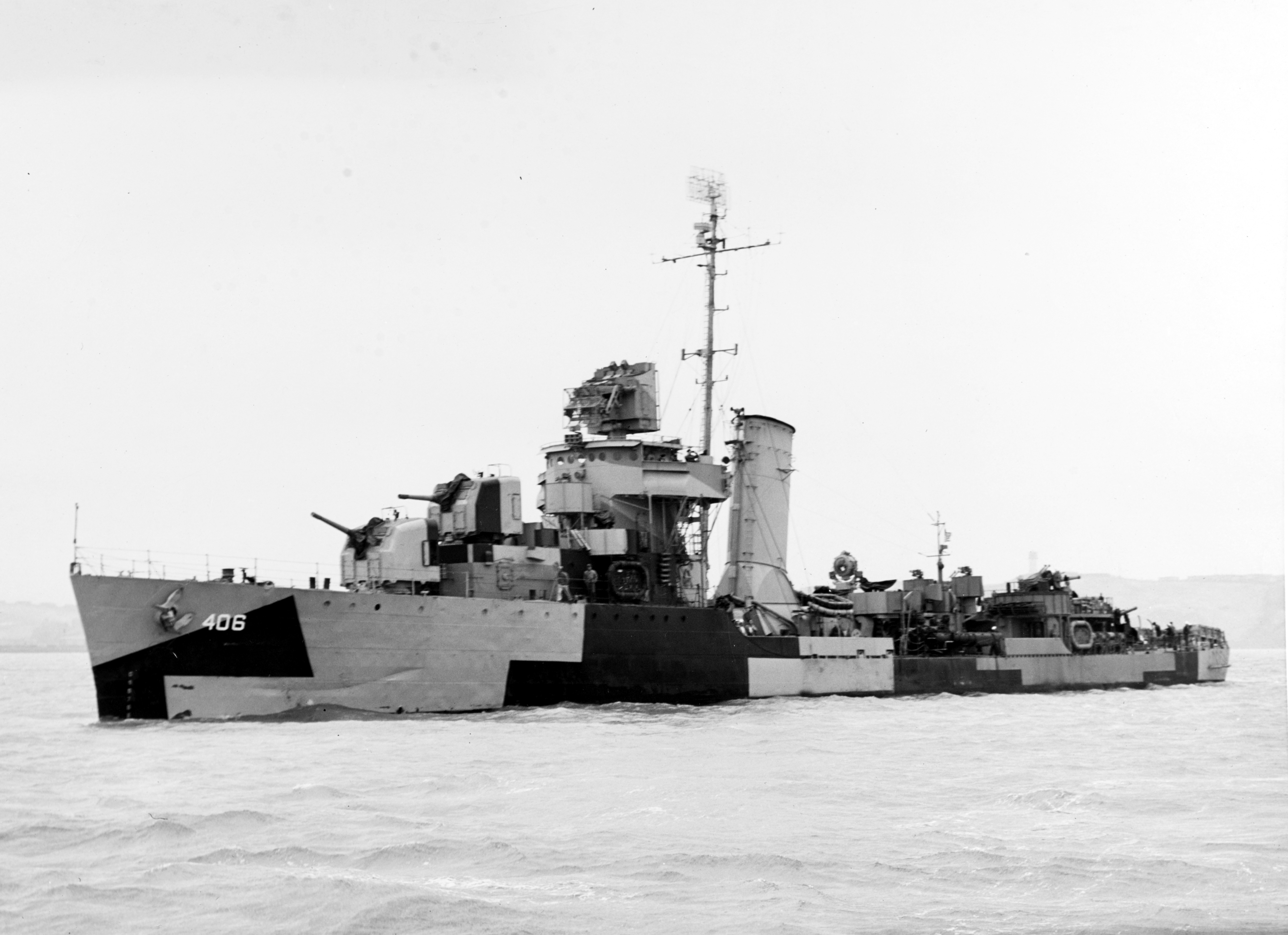
- Stack off of Mare Island Navy Yard, California, 27 May 1944.

History

United States
- Namesake: Edward Stack
- Builder: Norfolk Navy Yard
- Laid down: 25 June 1937
- Launched: 5 May 1938
- Commissioned: 20 November 1939
- Decommissioned: 29 August 1946
- Stricken: 28 May 1948
- Fate: Sunk 24 April 1948

General characteristics
- Class & type: Benham-class destroyer
- Displacement: 1500 tons
- Length: 341 ft 4 in
- Beam: 35 ft 6 in
- Draft: 14 ft 4 in
- Propulsion: 50,000 shp, Westinghouse Geared Turbines, 2 propellers
- Speed: 36.5 knots
- Complement: 176 officers and enlisted
- Armament: 4 × 5 in (130 mm)/38 guns; 16 × 21 inch (533 mm) torpedo tubes

USS Stack (DD-406) was a Benham-class destroyer in the United States Navy. She was named for Edward Stack.

== History ==
Stack was laid down on 25 June 1937 by the Norfolk Navy Yard, Portsmouth, Virginia; launched on 5 May 1938; sponsored by Miss Mary Teresa Stack; and commissioned on 20 November 1939, Lieutenant Commander Isaiah Olch in command.

Following shakedown which lasted until 4 April 1940, including a cruise to the West Indies and Rio de Janeiro, Stack proceeded to the west coast and thence to Pearl Harbor where she operated with the Pacific Fleet until June 1941. She then returned to the east coast for an overhaul at the Philadelphia Navy Yard. Stack began patrolling off Bermuda late in November with the Neutrality Patrol. After the United States entered World War II, Stack continued to patrol in the Caribbean until 22 December when she was assigned to escort Wasp from Bermuda to Norfolk, Virginia.

On the 28th, she sailed from Norfolk as screen for Long Island, She arrived at Casco Bay, Maine, two days later. She refueled and got underway for Argentina in the screen for Long Island and Philadelphia.

=== 1942 ===
Arriving in Argentia on New Year's Day 1942, she was assigned to patrol duty. On 15 January 1942, she picked up two survivors from SS Dayrose which had been torpedoed the night before off Cape Race.

From 17 to 24 January, Stack escorted a convoy which was transporting the first American Expeditionary Force troops to Ireland. En route from Hvalfjörður to Reykjavík, Iceland, on 29 January, she was ordered on a submarine sweep after the USCGC Alexander Hamilton, operating with Task Force (TF) 15, was torpedoed. Steaming at 25 knots on a night sweep, Stack sighted a submarine close aboard. She returned to the point where it had been seen and made two depth charge attacks on sound contact. Sterett came to assist and also made two attacks. The submarine, U-132, suffered damage to a diesel compressor and was forced to return to France for repairs.

Stack departed Iceland on 31 January and operated out of Casco Bay until 17 March. That morning, patrolling with zero visibility, she collided with Wasp. Since her number one fireroom was completely flooded, she steamed to the Philadelphia Navy Yard and underwent repairs until May.

On 5 June, Stack joined TF 37 consisting of Wasp, Quincy, San Juan, Lang, Wilson, Buchanan, and Farenholt and headed for San Diego, California. The force arrived there on 19 June, was redesignated TF 18, and ordered to Nukuʻalofa, Tongatapu Island, on the 25th. Arriving on 18 July, the ships spent five days preparing for battle, and sailed for the invasion of Guadalcanal, Solomon Islands.

=== 1943 ===
Stack covered the Guadalcanal-Tulagi landings with Destroyer Squadron (DesRon) 12 and was then assigned independent escort and patrol duty in the Guadalcanal area. On 16 January 1943, she was ordered to return to the west coast, via Pearl Harbor, for yard availability. Stack entered the Mare Island Navy Yard on 2 February. Following repair, overhaul and sea trials, she sailed on the 23d to escort SS Matsonia to Pearl Harbor and continue on to Efate, New Hebrides Islands.

Stack operated out of Efate from 20 April until late May. During this time, she made several patrols off Guadalcanal. She then screened Maryland covering the southern supply routes. Assigned to TF 31 in July and August, she had her first opportunity to "slug it out" with the enemy. Stack was under attack by Japanese aircraft on 17 and 18 July near New Georgia Island. On the night of 6 and 7 August, in what would be known as the Battle of Vella Gulf, Stack, with other units of Task Group (TG) 31.2, was searching for enemy traffic along Gizo and Kolombangara island. At 2335, Dunlap reported that she had made radar contact at 19,000 yards. The group tracked the enemy and identified them as four ships in column. The American ships opened the battle with a successful torpedo attack, followed by gunfire and more torpedoes. This resulted in the sinking of three Japanese destroyers, Arashi, Hagikaze, and Kawakaze, and damage to the fourth. The destroyers were loaded with troops who were to have been landed at Kolombangara as reinforcements for the Japanese garrison there. There were no American losses, and the task group retired to Tulagi.

Stack joined TF 38 to participate in raids against Rabaul during November. On the 11th, two carrier attacks had already been launched when radar picked up a flight of incoming bogies. The actual attack began at 1355 when Stack commenced firing on a group of 20 Vals coming in on her starboard bow. Thereafter, antiaircraft fire was continuous from the task force against all types of Japanese planes. The attacking force numbered about 90 planes. Stack downed one and had two more probable kills.

Stack then operated with TG 50.4 during the assault and landings on Tarawa and Makin Island in the Gilberts. She was a unit of the group screening the carriers which were providing fighter cover to the landing forces, when it was attacked by enemy bombers on 20 November, the day of the landings.

Stack then steamed west of the Gilberts to participate in the combined aerial and shore bombardment of Nauru Island on 8 December 1943.

=== 1944 ===
In late January and early February 1944, Stack, as part of TF 58, participated in the bombardment and assault on Kwajalein and Majuro Atolls in the Marshalls. She was one of five destroyers in the Bombardment Support Group, which included three battleships, that shelled Roi-Namur and adjacent islands. On 17 and 18 February, the task force, now including nine carriers, carried out raids against the Japanese bastion at Truk and, on the 20th, against Jaluit Atoll.

Stack then departed the Central Pacific for Pearl Harbor and for the west coast of the United States. She was overhauled and held sea trials from 11 March to 22 June when she weighed anchor for Pearl Harbor and Milne Bay.

Stack arrived at Milne Bay on 15 July and began operations as a unit of TG 76.7. She laid a mine field off Wewak, New Guinea, and, on the night of 31 August and 1 September, shelled Kairiru Island in the Wewak area. Stack was part of the assault force that landed troops on Morotai, North Moluccas, on 15 September.

Stack was attached to TG 78.4 which entered Leyte Gulf on 17 October. She spent the next two days performing pin-point fire support in the Dinagat Island landing area. On the 20th, she, in company with Lang and five YM's, performed mine sweeping operations and provided antiaircraft support for landings in the Philippines on Pinaon Island.

=== 1945 ===
Stack, with TG 78.5, sortied from Sansapor, New Guinea, on 30 December 1944 bound for Lingayen Gulf to support the assault and landing at "Blue Beach", Luzon. During the period from 5 to 12 January 1945, she provided antisubmarine and antiaircraft cover for various units and call fire on the beaches. Stack spent the next three weeks escorting convoys between Leyte and Lingayen Gulfs.

On 8 February 1945, Stack departed San Pedro for the Solomon Islands and a period of upkeep, training, logistics, and exercises which were to last until mid-March. She sailed from Purvis Bay on the 15th; moored at Ulithi for a week; and, on 27 March, steamed for the Ryūkyūs with TF 53. Stack arrived off Okinawa on 1 April, "L-Day", and began her assigned duties as an antisubmarine and antiaircraft patrol ship. There were numerous enemy planes the next two days, and she fired on several. On the 5th, she was ordered to Saipan and thence to Ulithi where she joined TU 94.18.12 on 13 April for the return voyage to Okinawa.

Arriving at Hagushi on the 21st, Stack was assigned to patrol duty west of Zampa Misaki for the remainder of the month. She then patrolled southeast of Okinawa to cover the Sakashima Group during May and early June.

Stack reported to Louisville on 15 June 1945 and was directed to screen that vessel to Pearl Harbor. Stack had boiler trouble en route which forced her to undergo tender availability at Pearl Harbor until late July. She stood out of Pearl on the 27th underway for Eniwetok, Saipan, Okinawa, and Guam. On 28 August, she was en route from Guam to Truk Atoll with Brigadier General Leo D. Hermle, USMC, and various other Navy and Marine Corps officers on board for a preliminary conference with Japanese military authorities regarding the surrender of their forces. The conference was held on 30 August, and Stack returned to Guam. She remained in the Marianas until ordered to Iwo Jima on 16 September. Stack relieved Cummings on 19 September, at Haha Jima, as Commander, Naval Occupation Forces. She returned to the Marianas and remained in the area until 15 December when she weighed anchor for Pearl Harbor and the west coast.

== Fate ==
Stack arrived at San Diego on 30 December 1945 for stripping and reduction of her personnel. She sailed two weeks later for Pearl Harbor and ultimate disposal. She was assigned to Joint Task Force 1 as a target for Operation Crossroads, the atomic bomb tests to be held in the Marshall Islands. Stack arrived at Bikini Atoll on 29 May 1946. She survived the bomb tests of July and August and was decommissioned in the Marshalls on 29 August 1946. Stack was sunk by gunfire near Kwajalein on 24 April 1948 and struck from the Navy List on 28 May.

== Honors ==
Stack received 12 battle stars for World War II service.
