= Lamport (surname) =

Lamport is a surname. Notable people with the surname include:

- Allan A. Lamport, Mayor of Toronto
- Felicia Lamport (1916–1999), American poet and satirist
- Leslie Lamport, American computer scientist
- Paul H. Lamport (1907–1984), American businessman
- Stephen Lamport (born 1951), British diplomat
- William Lamport (1615–1659), Irish Catholic adventurer
- William H. Lamport (1811–1891), American politician
- William James Lamport, co-founder of the Lamport and Holt shipping line
