= Bernard Routh =

Irish Jesuit

Bernard Rothe
- Born: 11 February 1694–5; Kilkenny
- Died: 18 January 1768
- Occupation: Jesuit

Bernard Rothe (11 February 1694–5 – 18 January 1768) was an Irish Jesuit.

== Biography ==
Rothe was the son of Captain William Rothe (d. 1710) by Margaret O'Dogherty. He was born at Kilkenny on 11 February 1694–5. His father was great-grandson of Robert Rothe, the antiquary. Bernard entered the Society of Jesus on 1 October 1716, and was professed of the four vows on 2 February 1733–4. He devoted himself to the career of teaching, and for many years he was a professor in the Irish College at Poitiers, where he composed several works which prove his erudition and critical discernment. His superiors afterwards summoned him to Paris, and from 1739 to 1743 he was on the editorial staff of the ‘Journal de Trévoux.’ With the assistance of Father Castel, one of his religious brethren, he administered to Montesquieu the consolations of religion, but the charge that he attempted, after the death of Montesquieu, to obtain possession of his manuscripts is baseless. Suard, who was present on the occasion, directly contradicted this story. On the suppression of the Society of Jesus in France in 1764, Routh withdrew to Mons in Belgium, where he became confessor of the Princess Charlotte de Lorraine. He died at Mons on 18 January 1768.

His works are: 1. ‘Ode à la Reine,’ 4to. This is in the collection of poems published by the Collège Louis le Grand on the occasion of the marriage of Louis XV in 1725. 2. ‘Lettres Critiques sur “les Voyages de Cyrus”’ of Andrew Michael Ramsay [q. v.], Paris, 1728, 12mo. 3. ‘Suite de la nouvelle Cyropédie, ou Réflexions de Cyrus sur ses Voyages,’ Amsterdam, 1728, 8vo. 4. ‘Lettres critiques à Mr le comte * * * sur le Paradis Perdu et Reconquis de Milton par R. * *,’ Paris, 1731; this work is reprinted at the end of the French translation of ‘Paradise Lost’ by Dupré de Saint-Maur, 3 vols. 1775. 5. ‘Relation fidèle des troubles arrivés dans l'empire de Pluton, au sujet de l'histoire de Sethos, en quatre lettres écrites des Champs élisées à M. l'abbé * * [Terrasson], auteur de cette histoire,’ Amsterdam, 1731, 8vo, Paris [1743?]. 6. ‘Recherches sur la manière d'inhumer des Anciens à l'occasion des Tombeaux de Civaux en Poitou,’ Poitiers, 1738, 12mo, a rare and interesting dissertation. 7. ‘Noticia de la muerte de Monteschiu’ manuscript (Fe. 75) in the library at Madrid. 8. ‘Lettre sur la tragédie d'Osarphis,’ in the collected works of the Abbé Nadal, vol. iii. Routh was entrusted with the task of continuing Catrou and Rouillé's ‘Histoire Romaine,’ but he wrote only vol. xxi. (Paris, 1748, 4to).
