= 1st Venezuelan Rifles =

Integrated Irish regiment that participated in Venezuelan War of Independence

The 1st Venezuelan Rifles (Spanish: 1.^{er} Regimiento de Rifles de Venezuela) was a nominally Irish regiment that took part in the Venezuelan War of Independence. Commanded by Colonel Donald Campbell, a Scottish Protestant. Battalion Rifles was created on August 13, 1818 with the British Riflemen under the command of Colonel Robert Piggot, survivors of the Battle of La Puerta (1818), formerly called the Line Battalion or Fusiliers of the Honor Guard. Its nucleus was recruited by the British and its ranks were completed with Creole peoples and natives of the Caribbean. Later, the unit participated in actions that included expeditions through the Llanos and the Andes and the Boyacá Campaign, 1819. He fought until 1824, in the Battle of Ayacucho, saving with his sacrifice the army of Sucre, trapped in the Corpahuaico Gorge, a few days before.
