= Peter Martyn (soldier) =

Irish soldier (1772–1827)

- Born: 1772
- Died: 1827 (aged 54–55)
- Military career
- Units: 1st Cuirassier Regiment; Hohenzolleran Light Cavalry

Peter Martyn (1772–1827) was an Irish soldier. He was a member of one of the Tribes of Galway. He was born in Castlebar, County Mayo in 1772. He joined the Imperial Service in June 1790 as a Second-Lieutenant in the 1st Cuirassier Regiment. He was promoted to captain in the Hohenzolleran Light Cavalry in March 1808, and was awarded the Knight's Cross of the Order of Maria Theresa in 1810. Following this, he was promoted to the rank of Major in 1812, serving with Count Kleanu's Light Cavalry Regiment. He retired in January 1822, and died at Arad, Hungary, on 21 May 1827. Among his descendants was the artist, Ferenc Martyn.
