= Eulalia Ramos =

Independence-affiliated Venezuelan woman

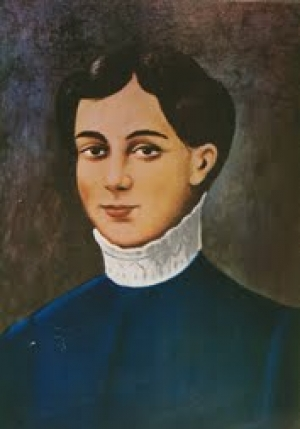
Eulalia Ramos

Eulalia Ramos Sánchez (known as Eulalia Buroz or Eulalia Chamberlain; 1795 – 7 April 1817) was a woman involved in the Venezuelan War of Independence.

== Biography ==
Born in Miranda, she was the daughter of Don Ignacio Ramos and Doña María Alejandra González Henriquez. She married Juan José Vásquez. In 1814, she survived the 1814 Caracas Exodus and moved to Cartagena. She stayed a while in Haiti before moving to Cumaná where she learned that her husband had been executed on the orders of the Spanish General Monteverde. She then married the English Colonel, Charles Chamberlain, who was attached to the Staff of General Bolivar. Chamberlain had been severely wounded in the battle of Unare Barracks and took refuge with Eulalia in Venezuela in Barcelona, Anzoátegui.

On 7 April 1817 the Royalist Army took Barcelona. The town's entire population took refuge in the Convent of San Francisco. After Chamberlain died in combat, Ramos attempted to move his body before being captured and beaten by a Spanish officer. He proposed that she gives up the independence cause in exchange for remaining alive, but she quickly took his gun and shot him in the chest, killing him instantly, while shouting "Viva la Patria -- mueran los tiranos". Immediately, the other Spaniards pounced on her, killing her with their bayonets, while the army fell into the hands of the royalist forces.
