= William Walsh (Irish soldier) =

William Walsh, Irish soldier and officer, fl. 1605–1616.

Captain Walsh was from Galway. He was awarded a commission in 1605 after recruiting sixty soldiers in Ireland at his own expense. Significantly, the majority of levies among Irish exiles that year were conducted by Old English captains. Walsh was wounded in 1616 while in the service of Colonel John O'Neill. He is listed in Priests in Ireland and Gentlemen gone abroad, written c. 1618.
