= Edward Stack (U.S. Marine Corps officer) =

Edward Stack (April 26, 1756 – December 1833) was an officer in the United States Marine Corps during the American Revolutionary War.

== Biography ==
Edward Stack was born in Kelad, County Kerry, Ireland. Entering the service of Louis XV in 1770 as an ensign in the Irish Brigade, he was appointed aide de camp to the king in 1772. He was promoted to lieutenant in 1777 and accompanied the Marquis de Lafayette's expedition to Virginia in 1778. He returned to France 1779. Stack was appointed 2nd lieutenant in the United States Marine Corps by John Paul Jones on February 4, 1779. He embarked at Lorient on the Privateer Bonhomme Richard (Captain John Paul Jones) in August 1779.

Stack commanded the division in the main top of the Bonhomme Richard during her battle with HMS Serapis on September 23, 1779, off Flamborough Head, Yorkshire. The Battle of Flamborough Head resulted in the capture of the Serapis. In his report of the action, Jones commended Stack for his great bravery, crediting him with the victory, which historians now conclude turned the tide of war for America.

Lt. Stack remained in United States service until 1780. Later, he returned to France and was appointed to Dillon's Regiment in the Irish Brigade, with whom he accompanied the Marquis de Bouille's expedition to the West Indies and assisted in the reduction of Tobago, St. Kitts, Nevis and Montserrat.

Stack was promoted captain in 1789 and appointed Chevalier de St. Louis and Chevalier de Cincinnatus d'Amerique by Louis XVI. He was promoted major in 1791, and lieutenant colonel in 1793.

The Irish Brigade, then serving in the West Indies, refused to serve under the Committee of Public Safety and transferred to the British Service 1794. At their final reduction in 1798 Lieut. Colonel Stack was placed on half-pay. In 1801 he was promoted colonel to command the North Lowland Fencible Brigade which was broken up at the Peace of Amiens.

Proceeding on leave of absence to France, he was arrested at the declaration of war and confined to the Citadelle de Bitche but advanced to brigadier general whilst in captivity 1803, detected in 1804 executing secret service work for the British government, sentenced to be shot together with Duc d'Enghien, but reprieved at the last moment by the Emperor Napoleon.

He transferred to Verdun in 1806, promoted major general, 1808, promoted lieutenant general 1813; released by Louis XVIII in 1814 and returned to England, promoted general 1830.

General Stack died at Calais, France, in December 1833. USS Stack (DD-406) was named for him.
