= Michael Rothe =

Irish general

- Born: 29 September 1661; Kilkenny
- Died: 2 May 1741 (aged 79); Paris
- Occupation: General

Michael Rothe (29 September 1661 – 2 May 1741) was an Irish general in the French service.

== Biography ==
Rothe was born at Kilkenny on 29 September 1661. He was the second son of Edward Rothe (‘FitzPeter’), the great-grandson of John Rothe of Kilkenny, father of David Rothe, bishop of Ossory, by Catherine (Archdekin). In 1686, the army in Ireland was remodelled and increased, and Michael Rothe received a commission as lieutenant in the king's royal Irish regiment of footguards, of which the Duke of Ormonde was colonel. At the revolution, the regiment maintained its allegiance to James II, under the command of its lieutenant-colonel, William Dorrington (by whose name it afterwards became known), and Rothe was promoted captain in the command of the first or king's own company. By James's charter he was named an alderman of Kilkenny. He served with his regiment throughout the campaign of 1689–91, and fought at the battle of the Boyne (1 July 1690), where his kinsman, Thomas Rothe of the Irish lifeguards, lost his life.

After the treaty of Limerick, his regiment elected to enter the French service, and set sail for France in the autumn of 1691. For his adhesion to the Stuart cause, Rothe was attainted and his estate forfeited; his large brick mansion in Kilkenny was sold at Chichester House, Dublin, in 1703, and purchased for 45l. by Alderman Isaac Mukins (cf. O'Hart, Landed Gentry, p. 513; Ledwich, Antiquities of Irish-town, p. 487; Hogan, Kilkenny). On their arrival in France, the Irish regiments were mustered at Vannes in the south of Brittany, and were there reviewed by James II in January 1692. Rothe's regiment was incorporated with the Irish brigades in the service of France, and was stationed in Normandy as part of the army destined for the invasion of England. This design was frustrated by the English victory off Cape La Hogue; but in 1693 Rothe saw active service in Flanders under the Marshal de Luxembourg, taking part in the capture of Huy, the battle of Landen, where William III and the allies were defeated on 29 July 1693, and the taking of Charleroi in the following October. In 1694, he served with the army of Germany, and in 1695 with the army of the Moselle. After the peace of Ryswick, King James's regiment of footguards was formed, by an order dated 27 February 1698, into the regiment of Dorrington, and Rothe was made its lieutenant-colonel by commission of 27 April. Promoted colonel in May 1701, he served during that year with the army of Germany under the Duke of Burgundy and Marshal de Catinat. In 1703, he joined the army of Villars in the Vosges, and took part in the capture of Kehl, the storming of Hornberg in the Black Forest, the combat of Munderkingen, and the first battle of Hochstadt, in which the French gained the day; he did not follow Villars in 1704 in his campaign against the Camisards, but served under his successor, Marshal Marsin, and shared in the rout of the French at Blenheim, where his regiment had the good fortune to escape being captured. Created brigadier, by brevet dated 18 April 1706, he was again attached to the army of the Rhine under Villars, and was present at the reduction of Drusenheim, of Lauterburgh, and of the Ile de Marquisat (Mém. de Maréchal Villars, ed. Vogüé, 1887, ii. 202, 213). In 1707, under the same general, he was at the carrying of the lines of Stolhoffen, the reduction of Etlingen, of Pfortzeim, of Winhing, of Schorndorf, at the defeat and capture of General Janus, the surrender of Suabsgemund, and the affair of Seckingen, while, by order of 31 Oct., he was employed during the winter in Alsace. He continued with the army of the Rhine under Berwick until June 1709, when he was transferred to Flanders and highly distinguished himself at the battle of Malplaquet. In the absence of Dorrington, he commanded his regiment, which was engaged, in the centre, in the very hottest of the battle. When the left of the French army recoiled before the tremendous fire of the British right, Villars brought up the Irish brigade to its support. Rothe and Cautillon led a successful charge, crying ‘Forward, brave Irishmen! Long live King James III!’ Thirty officers of his regiment were killed. Appointed maréchal-de-camp or major-general by brevet of 29 March 1710, and being next in command to M. du Puy de Vauban in the remarkable defence of Bethune against the Duke of Marlborough, he so distinguished himself that Louis XIV, by brevet of 15 December, named him for the second commandership of the order of St. Louis that should become vacant (see Brodrick, Hist. of the late War, 1713, p. 334). After serving another sixteen months in Flanders, he obtained this honour on 9 April 1712, and served during the following summer at the taking of Douay, Quesnoy, and Bouchain. In 1713 he took a prominent part under Villars in the reduction of Friburg and Landau by the army of the Rhine.

Upon the death of Lieutenant-general Dorrington on 11 December 1718, by commission dated the following day the command of the regiment was transferred to Rothe, and hence became known as the ‘regiment of Rothe,’ a name which it bore for forty-eight years; during the whole of this period it continued to wear the scarlet and blue uniform of the ‘King's Own Footguards’ (British). In 1719, Rothe joined the army of Spain under the Duke of Berwick, and commanded his regiment at the reduction of Fontarabia and San Sebastian, and the siege of Rosas (cf. Wilson, Duke of Berwick, Marshal of France, pp. 430 sq.). At the end of the campaign he was created, on 13 March 1720, lieutenant-general of the armies of the king. His military skill and dauntless courage had attracted attention in England as well as on the continent. The author of ‘A Letter to Sir Robert Sutton for disbanding the Irish Regiments’ (Amsterdam, August 1727) speaks of Rothe's ‘memorable actions’ and ‘immortal reputation’ for courage, and in a letter to Lord Bolingbroke, dated from Scotland in 1716, the Pretender wrote, ‘I should have mentioned before that Rothe or Dillon I must have; one I can spare you, but not both; and, maybe, Dillon would be useful in Ireland.’ Rothe could have gone only at the expense of the commission he held from the French king, and prudently refused to make the sacrifice. He continued colonel-proprietor of his regiment until May 1733, when he made over the command to his son. He died at Paris, in his eightieth year, on 2 May 1741. He married Lady Catherine (1685–1763), youngest daughter of Charles, second earl of Middleton, by Lady Catherine, daughter of Robert Brudenel, first earl of Cardigan. By her he left an only son, Charles Edward Rothe, born 23 December 1710, who was granted a commission in his father's regiment as captain en second on 28 May 1719, took over the colonelcy on 28 May 1733, was made brigadier on 20 February 1743, served at Dettingen and, with much distinction, at Fontenoy, and was made lieutenant-general of the Irish and Scottish troops in the service of France on 31 March 1759. He met his death by an accident while residing at his château of Haute-Fontaine in Picardy on 16 August 1766 (see PUE, Occurrences, 6 Sept. 1766). He married Lucie (1728–1804), only daughter of Lucius Henry Cary, fifth viscount Falkland, by his second wife, Laura, daughter of Lieutenant-general Arthur Dillon, and by her left a daughter Lucie (d. 1782), who married in 1769 (as his first wife) her cousin, General Arthur Dillon, colonel of Dillon's regiment, and one of the victims of ‘the Terror’ (14 April 1794).
