= Manus O'Donell =

Austrian-Irish soldier and noble

Manus O'Donnell Colonel
- Died: 1737
- Military career
- Rank: Colonel

Manus O'Donnell, Irish soldier and noble, died 1737.

O'Donnell (O Domhnaill in Irish) was the son of Rory or Rodger O Donnell of Lifford, grandson of Colonel Manus O'Donnell who was killed in action at the Battle of Benburb in 1646, and grandson of Niall Garbh O'Donnell the last Gaelic chieftain of the O'Donnell clan. Rory of Lifford was transported to Mayo as part of the final conquest circa 1654. Manus, the only known son of Rory of Lifford was a colonel in the service of the Irish forces during the Williamite wars.

- Charles, who was the father of Count Manus O'Donell of Austria and Lewis O'Donell of Newcastle, County Mayo
- a son, name unknown
- Hugh, whose son, Sir Neal O'Donel Bt of Newport conformed to the Church of Ireland in 1763. This Neal gave evidence that lead to execution of the Fr Manus Sweeney a local Catholic priest who sided with the United Irishmen during the 1798 rebellion. The O'Donel Baronets of Newport descended from him. He and his sons strongly opposed the Acts of Union between Britain and Ireland. Sir Neal turned down the Earldom of Achill which had been proffered in return for his support for the Union.

The part of the O'Donnell clan that settled in Newport Co Mayo, altered the spelling of their surname to O'Donel and used a doubtful claim to gain ownership of the Cathach of St Columkille. Using that claim they were responsible for its return to Ireland in the early 19th century.
