= William Lamport =

Irish Catholic adventurer (1611/1615 – 1659)

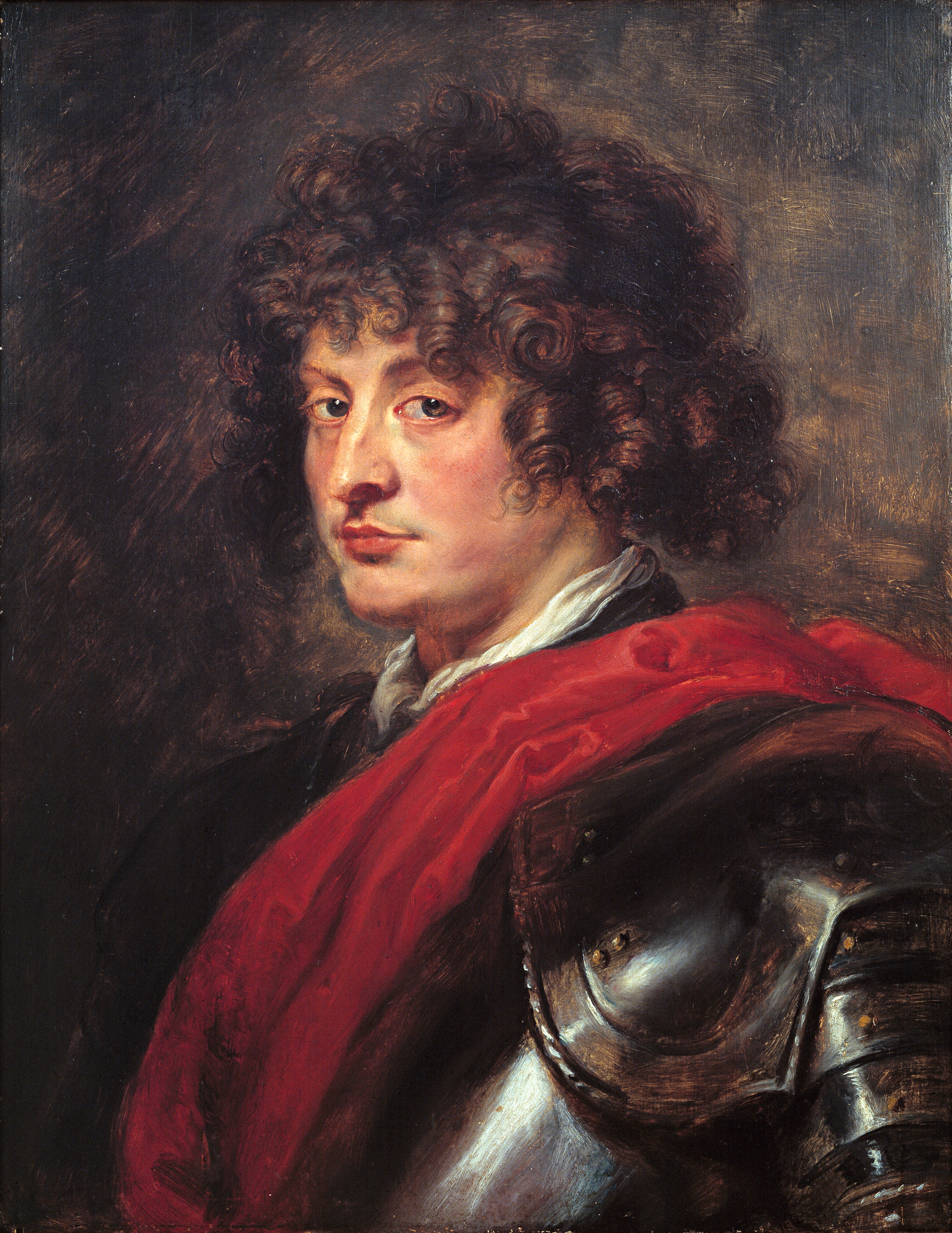
- Young man in armor, by Peter Paul Rubens, is reputedly of Lamport
- Born: 1611-1615; Wexford, Kingdom of Ireland
- Died: 1659; Mexico City, New Spain
- Military career
- Nickname: Guillén Lombardo

William Lamport (or Lampart) (1611/1615 – 1659) was an Irish Catholic adventurer, known in Mexico as "Don Guillén de Lamport (or Lombardo) y Guzmán". He was tried by the Mexican Inquisition for sedition and sentenced to death in 1659. He claimed to be a bastard son of King Philip III of Spain and therefore the half-brother of King Philip IV.

In 1642, he tried to foment rebellion against the Spanish crown, with the aid of black and Indigenous peoples, as well as creole merchants, but was denounced by a man he had hoped to recruit for his plan and arrested, languishing in the Inquisition jail for 17 years. A statue of Lamport is immediately inside the Angel of Independence monument in Mexico City.

To this day, Lamport is a hero in Mexico, and known internationally as an inspiration for the hero Zorro.

== Early years ==
=== Childhood and education ===
The main source for biographical information about Lamport is his own declaration before the Inquisition; it is difficult to tell how much of it is true. William Lamport was born in either 1611 (according to his brother) or 1615 (other sources) in Wexford, Ireland to a family of Catholic merchants.

Lamport underwent an extensive educational experience where he acquired knowledge on a diverse set of topics. His academic journey began in his hometown of Wexford, where he was taught by private tutors. He then received Catholic education from Jesuits in Dublin and London, and then at an Irish college in the great pilgrimage site of Santiago de Compostela in northwest Spain. By the time he finished his studies, he had successfully learned Spanish, Latin and Greek.

Since the Protestant monarchy in England increasingly restricted opportunities to Catholics, a number of colleges for Irishmen were set up in Spain. There were longstanding ties between Catholic Ireland and Spain, the staunch defender of Catholicism in Europe. Spain recognized Irish nobles on equal footing as Spaniards, and the Irish could claim Spanish citizenship.

In 1627, he claimed to have been arrested in London for sedition for distributing Catholic pamphlets. According to his testimony, he escaped, left Britain for Spain and became a pirate for the next two years. He is also said to have fought for the French at the Siege of La Rochelle against the Huguenots.

=== Military career ===
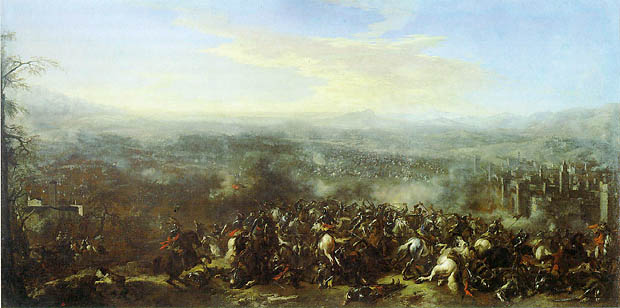
Lamport's participation in the Battle of Nordlingen attracted the interest of the Count-Duke of Olivares

In Spain, Lamport came to the attention of the Marquis of Mancera, perhaps via Mancera's sister whose late husband had been posted to London and apparently knew Lamport's tutor there. In 1633, he joined one of three Spanish-sponsored Irish regiments and took part in the combat against Swedish forces in the Spanish Netherlands. His participation in the Battle of Nordlingen in 1634 attracted the interest of the Count-Duke of Olivares, chief minister to Philip IV of Spain, who eventually helped him to enter the service of the King. By that time he had hispanized his name to Guillén Lombardo (in modern Mexico generally called Guillén de Lampart). During Lamport's service to the king, he found himself subject to the various privileges and advantages that came with being associated with the monarchy. After serving for many years, Lamport established himself as a notable veteran of the Spanish crown in 1640.

== At the Spanish court and then exile ==
Lamport had prepared a flattering memorial of Philip IV's most important political adviser, the Count-Duke Olivares and became a member of the court as a propagandist. In the 1630s, he became romantically linked to a young woman, Ana de Cano y Leiva, who became pregnant. Initially the couple lived together and Lamport's older brother John, now a Franciscan living in Spain, urged the couple to marry. They separated and then Lamport decamped for New Spain, sailing on the same ship that brought the incoming viceroy, the Marquis of Villena, and the other was Don Juan de Palafox y Mendoza, the incoming bishop of Puebla and the official in charge of the review of office (residencia) of the departing viceroy, Marquis of Cadereyta. Palafox and the new viceroy came into conflict almost immediately.

The scandal at court might well have prompted Lamport's exit from the court. Lamport claimed that he was sent to New Spain to provide information to the crown about the political situation there, as a spy or independent source on events. He said he was sent to determine if outgoing viceroy Cadereyta's information about creole discontent was accurate, but then to report on the new viceroy Villena. There is evidence he sent a report to the Count-Duke Olivares about Villena confirming negative reports, but in his personal papers there were pro-Villena drafts as well.

== Arrest and imprisonment ==
Political events warranted careful monitoring. In 1640, there was a major revolt in Catalonia, which was eventually suppressed. But there was the successful revolt in Portugal, throwing off Habsburg rule of the last 60 years, and placing John, Duke of Braganza as king. The situation in Mexico became politically fraught, since the new viceroy was a relative of the new Braganza monarch. Sometime around 1641, Lamport began hatching a plot to overthrow the viceroy, attempting to persuade Indigenous people, black people, and creole merchants to join in an uprising. He divulged his plans to one Captain Méndez; rather than signing on with Lamport, Méndez denounced him to the Inquisition after initially attempting to denounce him to the Audiencia, the civil high court. Méndez's testimony before the tribunal provides the information that Lamport claimed to have ties to the Spanish royal family, but Lamport's own testimony does not.

It is unclear why Lamport was tried by the Inquisition, since his alleged crimes did not generally fall under its jurisdiction. Lamport languished in prison for eight years, but escaped for one day, Christmas Eve 1650, with his cellmate, one Diego Pinto Bravo, likely placed as a spy. No guards were on duty that night and the two removed the bars of their cell and escaped. Rather than hightailing it to safety, Lamport attempted to deliver a letter to the viceroy and failing that, plastered the central area of the capital with accusations against the Inquisition. In a turn of events, the crown had 200 pamphlets denouncing Lamport printed and distributed. The inference can be that Lamport's escape was anticipated (and perhaps aided) and that the escape provided the rationale to prosecute him for more severe charges.

During the 60 years that Spain and Portugal had the same monarch, many Portuguese merchants, a number of whom were crypto-Jews (passing as Christians but practicing Judaism) had engaged in business in the Spanish Empire and were resident in Mexico City and Lima. With Portuguese independence, these Portuguese merchants became suspect as foreigners, but also potentially crypto-Jews. The Mexican Inquisition began intensely investigating the Portuguese merchant community which led to hundreds of prosecutions and ultimately a huge auto-da-fé in Mexico City in 1649. Despite evidence that as many accused and convicted as possible were included in the auto-da-fé of 1649, William Lamport was not one of them, perhaps because evidence against him was not strong enough to warrant conviction at the time.

During his imprisonment, he had access to pen and paper and he composed religious psalms in Latin. Some of Lamport's original writings are now available in digital form.

== Execution ==
In 1659, after 17 years in the Inquisition jail, the Mexican Inquisition condemned him to death as a heretic and sentenced him to be burned at the stake. An account of the auto-da-fé is found in the diary of Gregorio Martín de Guijo, who explicitly notes Don Guillén de Lombardo's presence in the procession of those convicted. A contemporary report holds that he struggled out of his ropes before he would burn to death and strangled himself by his iron collar.

== Political ideas ==
Don Guillén was a highly educated man who had moved in the highest circles of political power in Spain. What prompted him in 1641 to begin formulating plans for rebellion and independence in New Spain is not clear, but the writings confiscated at the time of his arrest indicate that he was informed about political philosophy of popular sovereignty. When he was arrested 26 October 1642, there was a large cache of papers where he lived, which including a proclamation of independence, and other writings spelling out his political ideas and plans for rebellion. A key point in his political thinking was that the Spanish crown lacked legitimacy to rule New Spain, closely following the reasoning of the likes of 16th century critic Bartolomé de las Casas. He proposed for New Spain political sovereignty under the rule of a monarch with limited powers popularly chosen by groups who actively supported rebellion and independence.

Don Guillén's writings indicate he was aware of sectors of New Spain's population discontented with Spanish rule. He already knew that viceroy Cadereyta had informed the crown about creole discontent. Bishop Don Juan de Palafox y Mendoza, whom he had sailed with to New Spain in 1640, became aligned with creoles against viceroy Villena. It is not surprising then that in Don Guillen's description of sectors of New Spain's population that were dispossessed and oppressed by the crown that American-born Spaniards came first. Although he had denounced the illegitimacy of the Spanish crown's sovereignty, Don Guillén mentions first the American-born Spaniards (creoles). From the mid-16th century forward, the crown had moved against the privileges of the Spanish conquerors, in particular putting limits on the encomienda, grants of the labor and tribute from particular native towns to particular Spaniards by ending their inheritance in perpetuity. The crown increasingly privileged peninsular-born Spaniards over creoles for appointment to civil and ecclesiastical posts. Men who were appointed viceroy were almost exclusively peninsular-born, whose loyalty to the Spanish crown was considered absolute.

In the appointment of Cadereyte, a creole born in Peru, the crown had diverged from its pattern. His replacement viceroy Villena, was a disaster, since he was the cousin of João Braganza, who became king of Portugal following their successful rebellion in 1640 from the Spanish crown, and in Mexico City, the viceroy appeared to favor the Portuguese merchant community, many of whom were conversos or crypto-Jews. Don Guillén prepared a report to the Count-Duke Olivares that there was real cause for concern with viceroy Villena.

Bishop Palafox had aligned with creole elites had similarly raised concerns about the situation to the crown. An order for the removal of viceroy Villena was issued in 1642. Palafox became viceroy, but this turned out to be only an interim appointment, with the crown quickly appointing a successor who would re-establish the traditional pattern of crown authority. Creole hopes for a more sympathetic viceroy were ended.

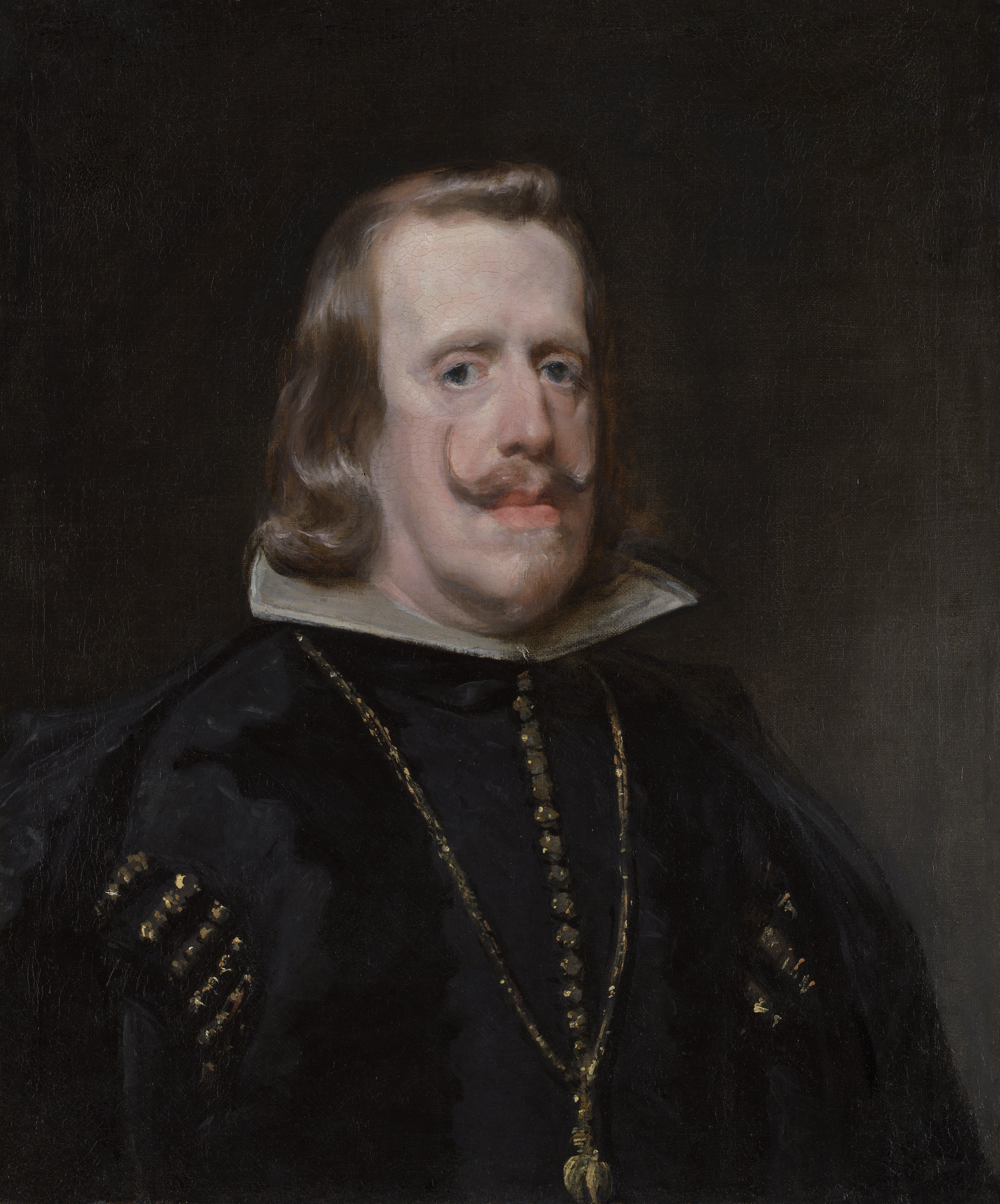
Lamport claimed to be half-brother of King Philip IV.

Don Guillén's monarchy would have entailed promises to the creole elites. He focused on their grievances about Spanish trade restrictions on Mexican merchants trading directly with the Far East and with Peru. He also envisioned Mexicans retaining the wealth of their silver mines, which did bring some local prosperity, but which also was the basis for the crown's wealth. By retaining its silver, Mexico would be in a position to fund an army, increase prosperity, and become a major player in the world both politically and economically. During the period Don Guillén was developing his ideas and plotting to achieve them, he began to spin a story that he was, in fact, the bastard half-brother of Spain's king, Philip IV of Spain. With this purported royal connection to the Spanish crown, the Hispanicized Irishman could turn himself into a viable candidate to be king of Mexico.

Don Guillén was also aware of the situation of the Indigenous peoples of Mexico. Residing in the viceregal capital, which had the largest concentration of Spaniards in that realm, Don Guillén nonetheless could and did have contact with the Indigenous in Mexico City. He had become friends with one Don Ignacio, a native nobleman of San Martín Acamistlahuacan, via the creole family with whom Don Guillén was living. Don Ignacio was a bilingual native ("indio ladino") in Mexico City to institute a lawsuit against the Spanish official whom the community contended participated in the abuse of Indigenous laborers in the silver mines of Taxco. Don Guillén helped prepare legal briefs for the lawsuit, which is doubtless how he became familiar with the type and extent of Spanish abuse of native labor. Don Guillén discussed his political plans with Don Ignacio. Don Ignacio apparently convinced Don Guillén that the natives in Taxco would be willing to rise in rebellion against the crown due to forced labor. In Don Guillén's writings, he declares that in fact, New Spain rightfully belongs not to the crown of Spain but to the Indigenous, "the kingdom is theirs" and that only they had sovereignty and the right to choose their king. As their king, he would "restore [the Natives] to their liberty and to their ancient laws."

Don Ignacio was called before the Inquisition to give testimony following Don Guillén's arrest, but as an Indigenous man, Don Ignacio was exempt from the tribunal's jurisdiction. Don Guillén was also concerned with black slavery, seeing it as another injustice, and the enslaved as potential supporters. In a psalm he wrote in 1655 while imprisoned, he asks why Spaniards who claim to be Christians are involved with slavery. "Why do you buy and sell men as if they were beasts? … They are unjustly sold to you and unjustly you buy them. You commit a savage and cruel crime before God…."

In the new order that Don Guillén envisioned, creoles, black people, and Indigenous peoples would have equal rights, as long as they had participated in the rebellion against the Spanish crown. Those who did not were subject to exile to the northern desert. Don Guillén also envisioned a limited monarchy to act only by the assembly of "Indians and freedmen are to have the same voice and vote as the Spaniards", thus ending the colonial "sistema de castas" assigning differential rights according to class and racial status.

Don Guillén was clearly convinced that there was enough discontent in New Spain to bring about a rebellion and then complete political independence and considered natives, creole elites, and enslaved black supporters for such an idea. "Don Guillén's plan crossed ethnic divides to seek a new social contract among all inhabitants of New Spain." However, unlike the increasing absolutist policies of the Spanish crown, Don Guillén envisioned his monarchy as being limited and based on the people's concession of sovereignty to him, a contractual relationship between monarch and those he ruled. He diverged from 16th century Spanish thought on the popular concession of sovereignty to the monarch being irrevocable once conceded, and asserted that the people retained the right of rebellion if the monarch became a tyrant. Don Guillén may have read a 16th-century treatise that defended tyrannicide.

In Don Guillén's view, the Spanish control of its overseas empire was unjustified, following the century-old arguments of Bartolomé de las Casas. Inquisition officials read this argument in Don Guillén's seized papers and restated in the trial record the official position on the justification of Spanish sovereignty. In his papers, there is sufficient evidence he planned to present a forged authorization to religious authorities removing the new viceroy, similar to the valid one used by Palafox to remove Villena. But this was just the beginning of his longer range plans. He expected only initially to retain the structure of the viceroyalty as a Spanish jurisdiction. However, once he consolidated power, he would rouse Mexicans to support a full independence movement and convoke popular assemblies, which would then declare Don Guillén king. His own writings record the imagined public acclaim, "long live Don Guillén our Emperor, our King, and our liberator, Viva!" Also part of his personal papers were letters to European monarchs who might be supportive of an independent Mexico, in particular, the new Portuguese monarch, but also the king of France.

== Legacy ==
=== Works ===
Apart from his adventurous life, his only undisputed claim to fame probably lies in the fact that he was the author of the first declaration of independence in the Indies, a document that promised land reform, equality of opportunity, racial equality, and a democratically elected monarch over a century before the French Revolution.

=== Memorials ===
A statue of Lamport is immediately inside the Angel of Independence, a major historical monument in Mexico City. Visitors are prohibited from photography in the space. There is a primary school in Mexico City named after him and in Oaxaca, the Instituto Guillén de Lampart; but, in general, in Mexico, he is not part of the pantheon of leaders of independence, despite his statue in the Monument to Independence.

=== Zorro ===
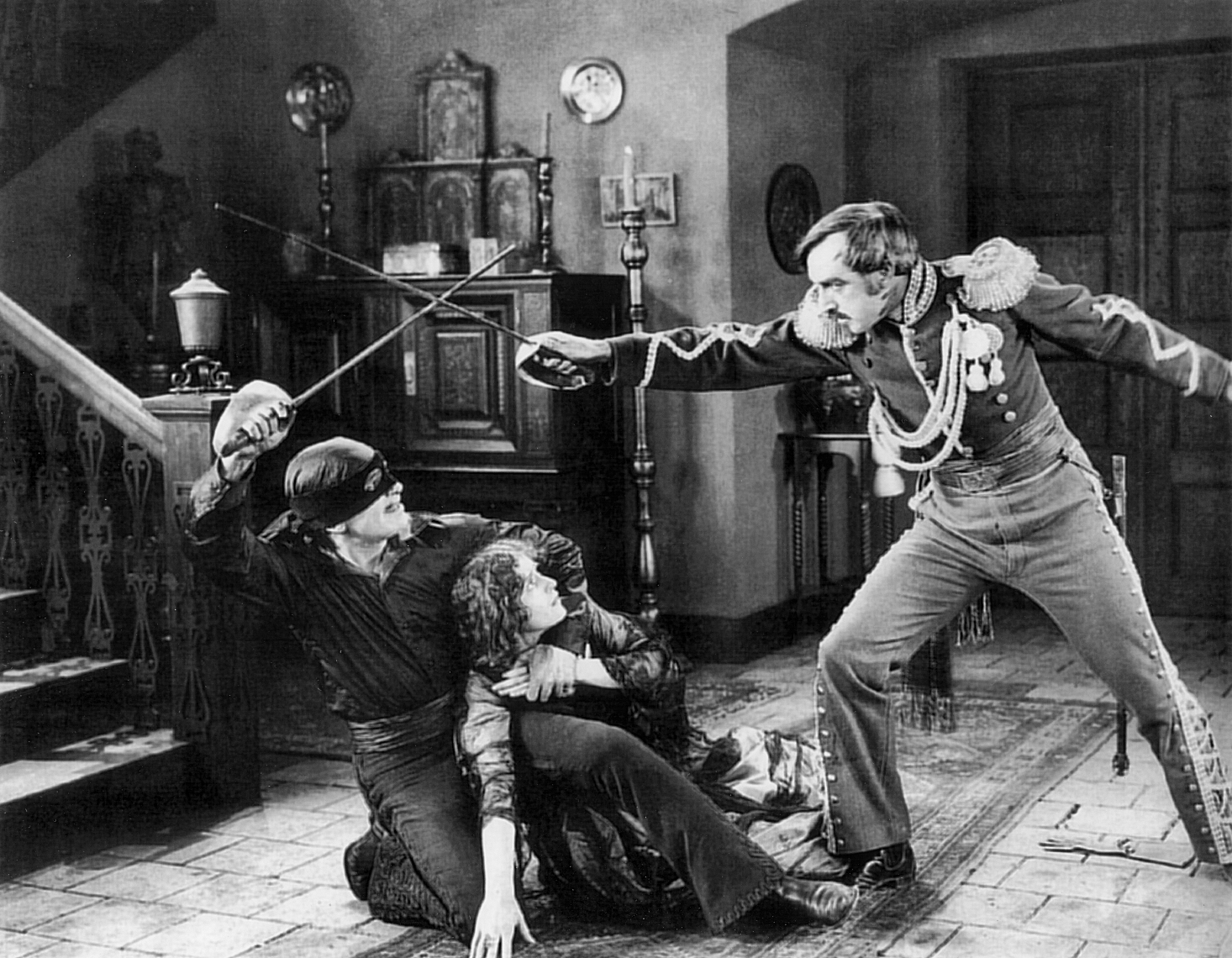
Douglas Fairbanks in the film, "The Mask of Zorro" (1920)

During Lamport's life, he became known as a voice for the oppressed as he wanted to free Mexico's Indigenous people and the black slaves. After his death, his fame only grew amongst the underprivileged and the Franciscans. Leading up to Mexico's rebellions, the Indigenous people of Mexico drew from Lamport's works and his bravery as a source of their inspiration. Lamport's adventurous life was detailed in Vicente Riva Palacio's novel titled Memorias de un impostor: Don Guillén de Lampart, Rey de México. In the novel Riva Palacio introduces us to Guillen Lombardo, who is a double agent that secretly plots against Spain. This narrative has led many to argue that William Lamport was the inspiration for Johnston McCulley's fictional character known as "Zorro".

== See also ==
- Irish military diaspora

== Bibliography ==
- Cline, Sarah (2010). "William Lamport/Guillén de Lombardo (1611-1659): Mexico's Irish Would-be King". In Racine, Karen; Mamigonian, Beatriz G. (eds.). The human tradition in the Atlantic world, 1500-1850. Lanham, Md.: Rowman & Littlefield Publishers. ISBN 978-1-4422-0699-1. OCLC 694772531.
- Crewe, Ryan Dominic (2010). "Brave New Spain: an Irishman's independence plot in seventeenth-century Mexico". Past and Present (207): 53–87. doi:10.1093/pastj/gtq005.
- González Obregón, Luis, ed. D. Guillén de Lampart: La Inquisición y la Independencia en el siglo XVII. Paris and Mexico: Librería de la Vda. de C. Bouret, 1908. - Inquisition trial record.
- Ronan, Gerard (2004). The Irish Zorro : the extraordinary adventures of William Lamport (1615-1659). Dingle: Brandon. ISBN 0-86322-329-X. OCLC 58386120.
- Troncarelli, Fabio (Autumn 2001). "The Man Behind the Mask of Zorro". History Ireland. 9 (3): 22.
