= Thomas Dillon, 4th Viscount Dillon =

Irish viscount (1615–1673)

Thomas Dillon
- Viscount Dillon
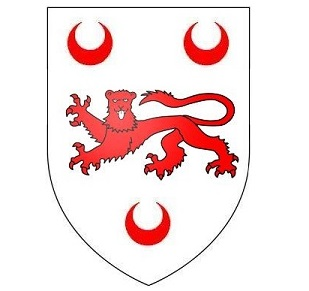
- Tenure: 1630–1673
- Predecessor: Theobald, 3rd Viscount Dillon
- Successor: Thomas, 5th Viscount Dillon
- Born: March 1615
- Died: 1673 (aged 57–58)
- Spouse: Frances White
- Issue Detail: Thomas & others
- Father: Christopher Dillon
- Mother: Jane Dillon

Thomas Dillon, 4th Viscount Dillon PC (Ire) (March 1615 – 1673) held his title for 42 years that saw Strafford's administration, the Irish Rebellion of 1641, the Irish Confederate Wars and the Cromwellian Conquest of Ireland. He was a royalist and supported Strafford and Ormond. He sided with the Confederates for a while but was a moderate who opposed Rinuccini, the papal nuncio.

Lord Dillon fled the field at the Battle of Dungan's Hill (1647) and did not rescue Ormond at the Battle of Rathmines (1649). However, he defended Athlone successfully against Ireton in 1650.

== Birth and origins ==
Family tree

Thomas Dillon with wife, parents, and other selected relatives. (Note: This family tree is partly derived from the Dillon family tree pictured in La Tour du Pin. Also see the lists of siblings and children in the text.)

Theobald; 1st Viscount d. 1624 | Eleanor; Tuite d. 1638
Christopher; Dillon of Ballylaghan d. 1624 d.v.p.* | Janet; Dillon m. 1604 | Lucas; Dillon; 1579–1656 of Loughglynn | James; Dillon c. 1600 – aft. 1669
Lucas; 2nd Viscount; 1610–1629 | Thomas; 4th Viscount; 1615–1673 | Frances; White d. 1664 | Theobald; Dillon | Robert; Dillon of Loughglynn
Theobald; 3rd Viscount; 1629–1630 | Thomas; 5th Viscount d. 1674 | Lucas; 6th Viscount d. 1682 | Theobald; 7th Viscount d. 1691; Jacobite
Henry; 8th Viscount d. 1714 | Frances; Hamilton d. 1751 | Arthur; 1670–1733; French; General | Christina; Sheldon; 1684–1757
Richard; 9th Viscount; 1688–1737 | Charles; 10th Viscount; 1701–1741 | Henry; 11th Viscount; 1705–1787 | Charlotte; Lee d. 1794

Legend

| XXX | Thomas; Dillon | XXX | Viscounts; Dillon |

*d.v.p. = predeceased his father (decessit vita patris)

Thomas was born in March 1615 (Note: Thomas is said to have been born in 'March 1615' but also 'in 1614'. Both are probably right as Ireland (like England) at the time used the Julian Calendar with a start of year on 25 March. Dates between 1 January and 25 March can be either adjusted to a start of the year on 1 January, as most modern historians do, or be reported in strict OS. That interpretation also agrees with Cokayne, who states that the 4th Viscount succeeded his father at the age of 15.) in Ireland. He was the second son of Christopher Dillon and his wife Jane Dillon. His father was the eldest son and heir apparent of Theobald Dillon, 1st Viscount Dillon. Christopher predeceased his father and therefore never succeeded as viscount. He was a member of the landed gentry and known as Christopher Dillon of Ballylaghan in County Mayo.

Thomas's mother was the eldest daughter of James Dillon, 1st Earl of Roscommon. His father's and his mother's family were branches of the same widespread Old English family, established in Ireland in 1185 when Sir Henry Dillon accompanied Prince John to Ireland. His parents married in 1604 and had seven sons and five daughters.

Thomas listed among his brothers
He appears below among his brothers as the second son:
1. Lucas (1610–1629), who was the 2nd Viscount Dillon
2. Thomas (1615–1673)
3. Theobald, the father of the 6th Viscount
4. James, never married
5. John, married Bingham's widow
6. Christopher, died young
7. Francis, who died young

Thomas's sisters
1. Joan, married John O'Madden, chief of his sept in the barony of Longford, Count Galway
2. Elizabeth, became a nun in the Order of St. Clare
3. Mary, became a nun in the Order of St. Clare
4. Eleanora, died young
5. Mary, died young

== Viscount ==
His father died on 28 February 1624 when Thomas was eight years old. His grandfather, the 1st Viscount, followed him into the grave two weeks later on 15 March 1624. His elder brother Lucas succeeded his grandfather as the 2nd Viscount Dillon. This Lucas stayed viscount for about five years and died in 1629, leaving a three months old child, Theobald, who became the 3rd Viscount and a ward of the King but lasted only about a year dying on 13 May 1630 in his infancy. Thomas, being his uncle, succeeded as the 4th Viscount Dillon of Costello-Gallen. As he was 15 at the time, he became a ward and the estate was seized by the King, who sold the wardship to Thomas's uncle Lucas Dillon of Loughglynn. (see Family tree) and to Charles Wilmot, 1st Viscount Wilmot. Lord Dillon, as he was now, in that same year converted to Protestantism and was received into the Church of Ireland.

== Marriage and children ==
In 1635 Lord Dillon, aged about 20, married Frances White, daughter of Nicholas White, esquire, of Leixlip, a Protestant, and granddaughter of Garret Moore, 1st Viscount Moore by her mother Ursula Moore. She brought him a dowry of £3000 (about £600,000 in 2025). Her sister Mary married Theobald Taaffe, the 2nd Viscount Taaffe (later 1st Earl of Carlingford), who thus became his brother-in-law.

Lucas and Frances had six sons and several daughters, who seem not to be known by name. The sons were:

1. Charles (born 1636), became a general in French and Spanish service;
2. Christopher (died 1663), never married;
3. Rupert, died while being a page to Charles II, during his exile;
4. Thomas (died 1674), became the 5th Viscount;
5. Ormond, died young;
6. Nicholas, died young.

== Strafford's administration ==
Thomas Wentworth, Viscount Wentworth, later the 1st Earl of Strafford, was appointed Lord Deputy of Ireland by Charles I on 12 April 1632. About 1636 Wentworth's sister Elizabeth married James Dillon, 3rd Earl of Roscommon, a first cousin on his mother's side. In January 1640 Wentworth was raised to Lord Lieutenant of Ireland. On 12 January 1640 Wentworth was created 1st Earl of Strafford.

Lord Strafford, as he now was, summoned an Irish Parliament in 1640. This was the second Irish parliament of King Charles I. On 16 March of that year, Lord Dillon took his seat in the House of Lords, which comprised all Irish peers and had a Catholic majority. The purpose of the parliament was to raise subsidies for an Irish army of 9000 for Charles I to fight the Scots in the Bishops' Wars. The Parliament unanimously voted four subsidies of £45,000. On 31 March 1640 parliament was prorogued until the first week of June.

On 3 April 1640 Strafford left Ireland, called elsewhere by the King, having appointed Christopher Wandesford as Lord Deputy. (Note: Strafford had been elevated from Lord Deputy to Lord Lieutenant and therefore could now appoint a deputy under him.) Wandesford opened the second parliamentary session on 1 June 1640. News from England was that the Short Parliament had refused subsidies to the King. The Irish MPs regretted having voted for subsidies and wanted to change how they would be evaluated and collected. After two weeks of inconclusive discussions, Wandesford prorogued parliament on 17 June.

When Parliament met again on 1 October, its mood had turned entirely against Strafford. The Commons sent a committee to England with a remonstrance that listed Strafford's excesses. Dillon together with Gormanston, Kilmallock and Muskerry were sent to London by the House of Lords to report grievances. Sometime in 1640 before the 23 October Lord Dillon was appointed a member of the Irish Privy council. Wandesford died on 3 December 1640 and was succeeded by Lord Leicester with the title of Lord Lieutenant of Ireland. Lord Leicester, however, never set foot on Irish soil.

== Irish wars ==
In October 1641 the Irish Rebellion broke out. In February 1642, the Irish Parliament sent Lord Dillon and his brother-in-law Lord Taaffe to England to submit grievances to Charles I. However, they were intercepted at Ware by order of the English House of Commons. They escaped a few months later and met the King at York. Upon Lord Dillon's return to Ireland, he was promoted Lieutenant-General.

On 15 September 1643 the Cessation, a ceasefire for one year was signed between the royalists and the Confederation. This cessation was renewed in September 1644.

In 1644 Lord Dillon was appointed joint President of Connaught together with Henry Wilmot, 2nd Viscount Wilmot, who had inherited his half of the presidency from his father, Charles Wilmot, 1st Viscount Wilmot in April 1644. Dillon replaced Roger Jones, 1st Viscount Ranelagh, who had died in 1643.

With the arrival of the papal nuncio, Giovanni Battista Rinuccini, in Ireland on 21 October 1645 Lord Dillon's Protestant religion caused him problems. He decided to convert back to Catholicism and on 6 December 1646 Lord Dillon was received back into the Roman Catholic Church by the Nuncio at St Mary's Church, (Note: This is the old parish church in the centre of the town, not St Mary's Cathedral, built in the 19th century.) Kilkenny. He had left Athlone under the command of Captain MacGawly, who betrayed him and handed the town over to Owen Roe O'Neill. After his conversion, the Confederate Council ordered O'Neill to give the town back to Lord Dillon, but O'Neill refused.

In August 1647, the Confederate Leinster army under Thomas Preston was severely beaten in the Battle of Dungan's Hill by Parliamentarian troops under Michael Jones. On this occasion Lord Dillon commanded the Confederate cavalry, which fled in the early stages of the battle.

Lord Dillon is mentioned several times in the Peace Treaty of 17 January 1649 between the Irish Confederates and Ormond, acting for Charles I, as "Thomas lord viscount Dillon of Costologh" (i.e. Costello-Gallen)". John Milton called him an "archrebel". He was one of the 12 commissioners of trust.

In 1649 Lord Dillon took part in Ormond's unsuccessful Siege of Dublin. He blockaded the Northside of the town with 2500 men and did not intervene, when General Michael Jones sallied in the south-east side of the town and defeated Ormond in the Battle of Rathmines on 2 August 1649. After the battle Ormond and Dillon retreated northwards to Trim. Some of his troops went to reinforce the garrison of Drogheda and were caught in the ensuing Siege of Drogheda by Cromwell, 3–11 September 1649.

In 1650 Lord Dillon successfully defended Athlone against a Parliamentarian army under Henry Ireton, skilfully holding him off by protracted parleys until Ireton decided to leave and rather reinforce Hardress Waller at the siege of Limerick. However, too much time had been lost and the parliamentarians took neither of these towns in the campaign of 1650. On 18 June 1651 Lord Dillon surrendered Athlone to Coote.

Lord Dillon's estates were confiscated by the Cromwellian Settlement of 1652, and he and his family lived in exile on the continent until the Restoration.

== Restoration, later life, death, and timeline ==
In 1662 he resigned the presidency of Connaught to Charles II for a payment of money. In 1663 most of his extensive lands were restored by the Act of Settlement 1662, and several high offices in the state were conferred upon him, including that of Custos Rotulorum of Westmeath. However, Dubhaltach Caoch Mac Coisdealbhaigh, who was descended from a family of the Gaelic nobility of Ireland that had been cheated out of their land by the 1st Viscount, resisted by organising rapparee actions. He was eventually shot in a skirmish in eastern County Mayo in 1667.

After 1669 Lord Dillon inherited an estate of 2,500 acres (10 km^{2}) in County Mayo and County Roscommon from his uncle, Sir James Dillon, youngest son of the 1st Viscount.

Lord Dillon died in 1673 and was succeeded by Thomas, his only surviving son, as the 5th Viscount. When the 5th Viscount died childless, the title passed to his first cousin Lucas, the 6th Viscount, and thereafter to the Loughglynn branch of the family, which descended from the 1st Viscount through his second son, Lucas Dillon of Loughglynn.

Most likely, Frances, his wife, outlived him and died in 1674, being buried in St. Mary's Chapel in Christ Church Cathedral. However, John Lodge thought that Frances was the Lady Dillon who has been recorded as dying in 1664 in Dillon's house in Winetavern Street, Dublin, and was buried at St James's.

Timeline
| Age | Date | Event |
|---|---|---|
| 0 | 1615, Mar | Born |
| 8 | 1624, 28 Feb | Father, Christopher Dillon, died. |
| 8–9 | 1624, 15 Mar | Grandfather, Theobald Dillon, the 1st Viscount, died and was succeeded by his eldest son, Lucas Dillon. |
| 9–10 | 1625, 27 Mar | Accession of King Charles I, succeeding King James I |
| 14 | 1629, 13 Apr | Eldest brother, Lucas, the 2nd Viscount, died and was succeeded by his posthumous infant son Theobald. |
| 15 | 1630, 13 May | Succeeded as the 4th Viscount Dillon' as his nephew Theobald, the 3rd Viscount, died |
| 14–15 | 1630, about | Became a Protestant |
| 15 | 1630, 8 Dec | Wardship bought by his uncle Lucas Dillon of Loughglynn |
| 16 | 1632, 12 Jan | Wentworth (later Lord Strafford) appointed Lord Deputy of Ireland. |
| 19–20 | 1635 | Married Frances White |
| 20–21 | 1636 | Eldest son, Charles, born. |
| 24–25 | 1640, 16 Mar | Took his seat in the House of Lords of the Irish Parliament |
| 26 | 1641, 12 May | Strafford beheaded |
| 26 | 1641, 23 Oct | Outbreak of the Rebellion |
| 26 | 1642, Feb | Sent with Taaffe by the Irish Parliament to England to submit grievances to Charles I |
| 28 | 1643, Sep | Loses Athlone to William Dillon and James Dillon |
| 28 | 1643, 15 Sep | Ormond's Cessation |
| 28 | 1643, 13 Nov | James Butler, 1st Marquess of Ormond appointed Lord Lieutenant of Ireland |
| 31 | 1646, 6 Dec | Converted back to Catholicism |
| 32 | 1647, Aug | Commanded the Confederate cavalry at the Battle of Dungan's Hill |
| 33 | 1649, 30 Jan | King Charles I beheaded |
| 34 | 1649, Aug | Blockaded the northern side of the Liffey during Ormond's Siege of Dublin |
| 34–35 | 1650 | Defended Athlone successfully against a parliamentarian army under Henry Ireton |
| 36 | 1651, 18 Jun | Surrendered Athlone to Coote |
| 36–37 | 1652 | Estates confiscated by the Cromwellian Settlement Act |
| 45 | 1660, 29 May | Restoration of King Charles II |
| 46–47 | 1662 | Resigned the presidency of Connaught |
| 47–48 | 1663 | Recovered his lands by the Act of Settlement |
| 51–52 | 1667, 3 May | Rapparee Dudley Costello, his enemy, shot dead in Coolcarney |
| 57–58 | 1673, about | Died and was succeeded by his son, also called Thomas Dillon, as the 5th Viscount |

== Notes and references ==
=== Sources ===
- Asch, Ronald G. (2004). "Wentworth, Thomas, first earl of Strafford (1593–1641)". In Matthew, Colin; Harrison, Brian (eds.). Oxford Dictionary of National Biography. Vol. 56. New York: Oxford University Press. pp. 142–157. ISBN 0-19-861408-X.
- Bagwell, Richard (1909a). Ireland under the Stuarts and under the Interregnum. Vol. I. London: Longmans, Green, and Co. OCLC 458582656. – 1603 to 1642
- Bagwell, Richard (1909b). Ireland under the Stuarts and under the Interregnum. Vol. II. London: Longmans, Green, and Co. OCLC 458582656. – 1642 to 1660 (for Scarrisholis and Charlemont)
- Burke, Bernard (1883). A Genealogical History of the Dormant, Abeyant, Forfeited and Extinct Peerages of the British Empire (New ed.). London: Harrison. OCLC 499232768. (for Strafford)
- Burke, Bernard; Burke, Ashworth Peter (1915). A Genealogical and Heraldic History of the Peerage and Baronetage, the Privy Council, Knightage and Companionage (77th ed.). London: Harrison. OCLC 1155471554.
- Burke, Bernard (1949). A Genealogical and Heraldic Dictionary of the Peerage and Baronetage of the British Empire (99th ed.). London: Burke's Peerage Ltd. (for Dillon)
- Carte, Thomas (1851) [1st pub. 1736]. The Life of James Duke of Ormond. Vol. IV (New ed.). Oxford: Oxford University Press. OCLC 1086656347. – 1660 to 1688 (for Dudley Costellogh)
- Coffey, Diarmid (1914). O'Neill and Ormond – A Chapter of Irish History. Dublin: Maunsel & Company. OCLC 906164979.
- Cokayne, George Edward (1896). Complete Peerage of England, Scotland, Ireland, Great Britain and the United Kingdom, Extant, Extinct, or Dormant. Vol. VII (1st ed.). London: George Bell and Sons. OCLC 1180891114. – S to T
- Cokayne, George Edward (1913). Gibbs, Vicary (ed.). The complete peerage of England, Scotland, Ireland, Great Britain and the United Kingdom, extant, extinct, or dormant. Vol. III (2nd ed.). London: St Catherine Press. OCLC 228661424. – Canonteign to Cutts (for Carlingford)
- Cokayne, George Edward (1916). Gibbs, Vicary (ed.). The complete peerage of England, Scotland, Ireland, Great Britain and the United Kingdom, extant, extinct, or dormant. Vol. IV (2nd ed.). London: St Catherine Press. OCLC 228661424. – Dacre to Dysart (for Dillon)
- Cokayne, George Edward (1895). Complete Peerage of England, Scotland, Ireland, Great Britain and the United Kingdom, Extant, Extinct, or Dormant. Vol. VI (1st ed.). London: George Bell and Sons. OCLC 1180818801. – N to R (for Ranelagh)
- D'Alton, Rev. Edward Alfred (1910). History of Ireland from the Earliest Times to the Present Day. Vol. Half-volume IV. London: The Gresham Publishing Company. OCLC 749686820. – 1649 to 1782
- Debrett, John (1828). Peerage of the United Kingdom of Great Britain and Ireland. Vol. II (17th ed.). London: F. C. and J. Rivington. OCLC 54499602. – Scotland and Ireland
- Firth, Charles Harding (1900). "Wilmot, Henry, first Earl of Rochester (1612?–1658)". In Lee, Sidney (ed.). Dictionary of National Biography. Vol. LXII Williamson–Worden. New York: The Macmillan Company. pp. 61–63. OCLC 8544105.
- Fryde, Edmund Boleslaw; Greenway, D. E.; Porter, S.; Roy, I., eds. (1986). Handbook of British Chronology. Royal Historical Society Guides and Handbooks, No. 2 (3rd ed.). London: Offices of the Royal Historical Society. ISBN 0-86193-106-8. – (for timeline)
- Gardiner, Samuel Rawson (1904). History of England from the Accession of James I to the Outbreak of the Civil War. Vol. IX. London: Longmans, Green & Co. OCLC 559091724. – 1639 to 1641
- Godwin, William (1827). History of the Commonwealth of England. Vol. The Third. London: Henry Colburn. OCLC 310477851. – 1649 to 1653
- Hayes-McCoy, Gerard Anthony (1990) [1st pub. 1969]. Irish Battles: A Military History of Ireland. Belfast: The Appletree Press. ISBN 0-86281-250-X. (for the Battle of Rathmines)
- Henderson, Thomas Finlayson (1888). "Dillon, Thomas, fourth Viscount (1615?–1672?)". In Lee, Sidney (ed.). Dictionary of National Biography. Vol. XV. New York: MacMillan and Co. pp. 86–87. OCLC 8544105.
- La Tour du Pin, Henriette-Lucy, Marquise de (1913). Journal d'une femme de cinquante ans [Diary of a Woman in her Fifties] (in French). Vol. I (7th ed.). Paris: Librairie Chapelot. OCLC 1047408815.
- Lenihan, Pádraig (2004). "Dillon, Thomas, fourth Viscount Dillon". In Matthew, Colin; Harrison, Brian (eds.). Oxford Dictionary of National Biography. Vol. 16. New York: Oxford University Press. pp. 225–226. ISBN 0-19-861366-0.
- Lodge, John (1789a). Archdall, Mervyn (ed.). The Peerage of Ireland or, A Genealogical History of the Present Nobility of that Kingdom. Vol. II. Dublin: James Moore. OCLC 264906028. – Earls (for Drogheda)
- Lodge, John (1789b). Archdall, Mervyn (ed.). The Peerage of Ireland or, A Genealogical History of the Present Nobility of that Kingdom. Vol. IV. Dublin: James Moore. OCLC 264906028. – Viscounts (for Dillon)
- McNeill, Ronald John (1911). "Leicester, Robert Sidney, Earl of" . In Chisholm, Hugh (ed.). Encyclopædia Britannica. Vol. 16 (11th ed.). Cambridge University Press. p. 392.
- Meehan, Rev. Charles Patrick (1882). The Confederation of Kilkenny (New revised and enlarged ed.). Dublin: James Duffy. OCLC 224157081.
- Milton, John (1834) [1649]. "Observations on the Articles of Peace, between James Earl of Ormond for King Charles the First on the one Hand, and the Irish Rebels and Papists on the other Hand". In Fletcher, Robert (ed.). The Prose Works of John Milton. London: Westley and Davis, Stationers' Court. pp. 247–270. OCLC 1051736587.
- Murphy, Elaine (October 2009). McGuire, James; Quinn, James (eds.). "Dillon, Thomas". Dictionary of Irish Biography.
- Murtagh, Harman (2004). "Dillon, Sir James". In Matthew, Colin; Harrison, Brian (eds.). Oxford Dictionary of National Biography. Vol. 16. New York: Oxford University Press. pp. 210–211. ISBN 0-19-861366-0.
- Warner, Ferdinand (1768a). History of the Rebellion and Civil-War in Ireland. Vol. I. Dublin: James William. OCLC 82770539. – 1641 to 1643
- Warner, Ferdinand (1768b). History of the Rebellion and Civil-War in Ireland. Vol. II. Dublin: James William. OCLC 82770539. – 1643 to 1660 and index
- Webb, Alfred (1878a). "Dillon, Theobald, Viscount". Compendium of Irish Biography. Dublin: M. H. Gill & Son. p. 149. OCLC 122693688.
- Webb, Alfred (1878b). "Dillon, Thomas, 4th Viscount". Compendium of Irish Biography. Dublin: M. H. Gill & Son. pp. 149–150. OCLC 122693688.
- Wedgwood, Cicely Veronica (1961). Thomas Wentworth, First Earl of Strafford 1593–1641. A Revaluation. London: Jonathan Cape. OCLC 1068569885.

Peerage of Ireland
| Preceded by Theobald Dillon | Viscount Dillon; 1630–1673 | Succeeded by Thomas Dillon |
