= Lucas Dillon, 6th Viscount Dillon =

Irish viscount (died 1682)

Lucas Dillon
- Viscount Dillon
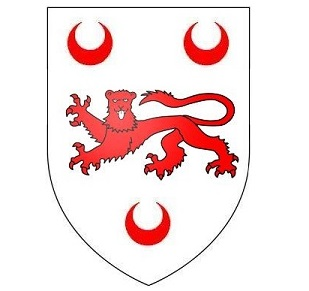
- Tenure: 1674–1682
- Predecessor: Lucas, 5th Viscount Dillon
- Successor: Theobald, 7th Viscount Dillon
- Died: September or October 1682; Kilfaughny, County Westmeath
- Spouses: Ursula Dongan; Anne Nugent
- Issue: Both marriages were childless
- Father: Theobald Dillon
- Mother: Sarah Bourke

Lucas Dillon, 6th Viscount Dillon (died 1682) was an Irish peer who recovered title and lands after the restoration of King Charles II.

== Birth and origins ==
Lucas was born in Ireland as the eldest son of Theobald Dillon and his wife Sarah Bourke. His father was the third son of Christopher Dillon, who was the eldest son and heir apparent of Theobald Dillon, 1st Viscount Dillon. The Dillons are an Old English family, established in 1185 when Sir Henry Dillon came to Ireland with Prince John. Lucas's mother was an illegitimate daughter of David Bourke, who was a younger son of Theobald Bourke, 1st Viscount Mayo. Her family, the Mayo Bourkes, were Gaelicised Old English.

He heads the list of siblings below as the eldest:

1. Lucas (died 1682)
2. James, who was a captain in the army

His sisters were:

1. Honora, who married firstly Robert Dillon of Lisnagragh and secondly James Dillon of Rathmane
2. Bridget, who married a Dillon of County Mayo

Family tree

Lucas Dillon with wife, parents, and other selected relatives. (Note: This family tree is partly derived from the Dillon family tree pictured in La Tour du Pin. Also see the lists of siblings in the text.)

Theobald; 1st Viscount d. 1624	Eleanor; Tuite d. 1638
Christopher; Dillon of Ballylaghan d. 1624 d.v.p.*	Janet; Dillon m. 1604	Lucas; Dillon of Loughglynn; 1579–1656
Lucas; 2nd Viscount; 1610–1629	Thomas; 4th Viscount; 1615–1673	Theobald; Dillon	Sarah; Bourke	Robert; Dillon of Loughglynn
Theobald; 3rd Viscount; 1629–1630	Thomas; 5th Viscount d. 1674	Ursula; Dongan d. 1680	Lucas; 6th Viscount d. 1682	Ann; Nugent	Theobald; 7th Viscount d. 1691; Jacobite
Henry; 8th Viscount d. 1714	Frances; Hamilton d. 1751	Arthur; 1670–1733; French; General	Christina; Sheldon; 1684–1757
Richard; 9th Viscount; 1688–1737	Charles; 10th Viscount; 1701–1741	Henry; 11th Viscount; 1705–1787	Charlotte; Lee d. 1794

Legend

XXX	Subject of the article	XXX	Viscounts; Dillon

*d.v.p. = predeceased his father (decessit vita patris)

== Viscount ==
Lucas's uncle Thomas Dillon, 4th Viscount Dillon, died in 1673 and was succeeded by his only surviving son, also called Thomas Dillon, Lucas's cousin. Thomas Dillon, the 5th Viscount died without surviving children a year later. Lucas succeeded him as the 6th Viscount Dillon in 1674. On 28 February 1675 he granted a yearly pension of £600 (about £100,000 in 2025) to Elizabeth, the widow of the 5th Viscount.

== Marriages ==
Lord Dillon, as he was now, married firstly Ursula, daughter of William Dongan, 1st Earl of Limerick, by Maria Euphemia, daughter of Sir Richard Chambers, Baronet. Ursula died childless in 1680. In 1682 he married secondly Lady Anne Nugent, daughter of Richard Nugent, 2nd Earl of Westmeath.

== Quit rent waiver ==
On 22 September 1675 Lord Dillon obtained from King Charles II the waver of the quit rents to the amount of £455 13s. 10d (about £80,000 in 2025) due to the Crown according to the Irish Act of Settlement of 1662.

== Death, succession, and timeline ==
A few months after his second marriage Lord Dillon suddenly died of dropsy in September or October 1682 at Kilfaughny, Westmeath, childless despite his two marriages. He was succeeded by Theobald as the 7th Viscount, a second cousin. His widow married secondly Sir William Talbot, 3rd Baronet and died after 14 July 1710.

Timeline
As his birth date is uncertain, so are all his ages.
Age	Date	Event
0	1650, estimate	Born. (Note: The year of birth, needed for the purposes of this table, is a very rough guess based on when he married and when he died.)
9–10	1660, 29 May	Restoration of King Charles II
23–24	1674	Succeeds his cousin, Thomas Dillon, as the 6th Viscount.
24–25	1675, 28 Feb	Grants a pension of £600 to the widow of his predecessor, the 5th Viscount.
24–25	1675, about	Married Ursula Dongan, his 1st wife.
24–25	1675, 22 Sep	Charles II waved the quit-rent for the lands restored to the 4th Viscount in the Act of Settlement of 1662.
29–30	1680	First wife died.
31–32	1682, Mar	Married Anne Nugent, his 2nd wife
31–32	1682, Sep or Oct	Died at Kilfaughny, County Westmeath

== Notes and references ==
=== Sources ===
- Burke, Bernard; Burke, Ashworth Peter (1915). A Genealogical and Heraldic History of the Peerage and Baronetage, the Privy Council, Knightage and Companionage (77th ed.). London: Harrison. OCLC 1155471554. (for Dillon)
- Cokayne, George Edward (1916). Gibbs, Vicary (ed.). The complete peerage of England, Scotland, Ireland, Great Britain and the United Kingdom, extant, extinct, or dormant. Vol. IV (2nd ed.). London: St Catherine Press. OCLC 228661424. – Dacre to Dysart
- Fryde, Edmund Boleslaw; Greenway, D. E.; Porter, S.; Roy, I., eds. (1986). Handbook of British Chronology. Royal Historical Society Guides and Handbooks, No. 2 (3rd ed.). London: Offices of the Royal Historical Society. ISBN 0-86193-106-8. – (for timeline)
- La Tour du Pin, Henriette-Lucy, Marquise de (1913). Journal d'une femme de cinquante ans [Diary of a Woman in her Fifties] (in French). Vol. I (7th ed.). Paris: Librairie Chapelot. OCLC 1047408815.
- Lodge, John (1789). Archdall, Mervyn (ed.). The Peerage of Ireland or, A Genealogical History of the Present Nobility of that Kingdom. Vol. IV. Dublin: James Moore. OCLC 264906028. – Viscounts (for Dillon)
- Webb, Alfred (1878). "Dillon, Theobald, Viscount". Compendium of Irish Biography. Dublin: M. H. Gill & Son. p. 149. OCLC 122693688. (for 1st Viscount)

Peerage of Ireland
Preceded by Thomas Dillon	Viscount Dillon; 1674–1682	Succeeded by Theobald Dillon
