= Henry Dillon, 8th Viscount Dillon =

Irish lord (died 1714)

Henry Dillon,
- Viscount Dillon
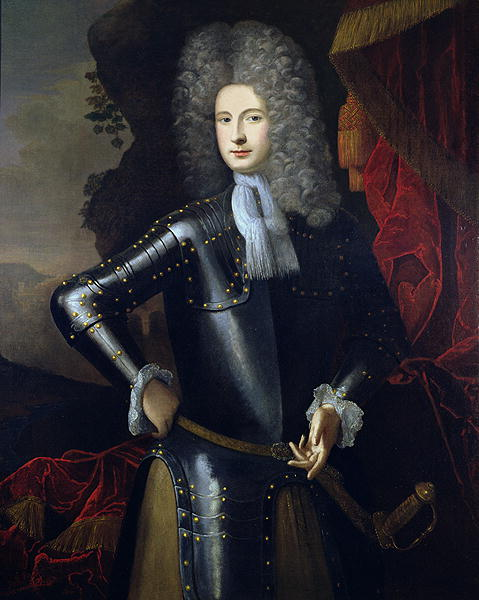
- Tenure: 1737–1714
- Predecessor: Theobald Dillon, 7th Viscount
- Successor: Richard Dillon, 9th Viscount
- Died: 13 January 1714; Dublin
- Spouse: Frances Hamilton
- Issue Detail: Bridget & Richard
- Father: Theobald Dillon, 7th Viscount
- Mother: Mary Talbot

Henry Dillon, 8th Viscount Dillon (died 1714) was an Irish soldier and politician. In 1689 he sat in the Patriot Parliament. He fought for the Jacobites during the Williamite War, defending Galway against Ginkel and surrendering it in 1691 after a short siege. He obtained the reversal of his father's attainder in 1696 recovering his father's lands.

== Birth and origins ==
Henry was born about 1665, (Note: His birth date is a very rough estimate, based on his marriage date and his brother Arthur's birth.) probably at his parents' house at Kilmore, County Roscommon, Ireland. He was the second but eldest surviving of the three sons of Theobald Dillon and his wife Mary Talbot. At that time his father was heir apparent of Lucas Dillon, 6th Viscount Dillon of Costello-Gallen, a remote cousin. His father's family was Old English and descended from Sir Henry Dillon who had come to Ireland with Prince John in 1185.

Henry's mother was a daughter of Sir Henry Talbot of Templeogue and his wife Margaret Talbot, who was a sister of Richard Talbot, 1st Earl of Tyrconnell. The Talbots also were an Old English family.

Both his parents were Catholic. He had two brothers, who are listed in his father's article. His younger brother, Arthur, later became a general in French service.

== Early life ==
In 1683 his father succeeded as the 7th Viscount Dillon. In 1688, at the Glorious Revolution, his father raised two regiments of foot for James II, Dillon commanded one of them, the other was commanded by his younger brother, Arthur.

Family tree

Henry Dillon with wife, parents, and other selected relatives. (Note: This family tree is partly derived from the Dillon family tree pictured in La Tour du Pin. Also see the lists of siblings and children in the text.)

Theobald; 1st Viscount d. 1624	Eleanor; Tuite d. 1638
Christopher; Dillon; Ballylaghan d. 1624	Lucas D. of Loughglynn	Jane; Moore
Lucas; 2nd 1610–1629	Thomas; 4th 1615–1673	Theobald; Dillon	Robert D. of Loughglynn	Rose Dillon of Streamstown d. 1681
Theobald; 3rd 1629–1630	Thomas; 5th d. 1674	Lucas; 6th d. 1682	Theobald; 7th d. 1691; Jacobite	Mary; Talbot d. 1691
Henry; 8th Viscount d. 1714	Frances; Hamilton d. 1751	Arthur; 1670–1733; French; General	Christina; Sheldon; 1684–1757
Richard; 9th 1688–1737	Charles; 10th 1701–1741	Henry; 11th 1705–1787	Charlotte; Lee d. 1794
Henrietta- Maria; Phipps; 1757–1782	Charles; 12th 1745–1813	Marie; Rogier d. 1833

Legend

XXX	Subject of the article	XXX	Viscounts; Dillon

== Marriage and children ==
In July 1687 Dillon married Frances Hamilton, second of the three daughters of comte George Hamilton and his wife Frances Jennings and step-daughter of Richard Talbot, 1st Earl of Tyrconnell, lord deputy of Ireland. These three sisters were known in Ireland as the three viscountesses as they all three married Irish viscounts.

Henry and Frances had at least two children:

1. Bridget
2. Richard (died 1737), who succeeded as the 9th Viscount

== Later life ==
In 1689 Dillon was one of the two members of parliament for County Westmeath in the House of Commons of the Patriot Parliament. In that same year he served as Lord Lieutenant of County Roscommon.

His father, the 7th Viscount, fell in the Battle of Aughrim on 12 July 1691 fighting under Saint-Ruhe against the Williamites under Ginkel. Henry succeeded as the 8th Viscount in the eyes of his Jacobite comrades, but his father had been attainted on 11 May 1691 and in the eyes of the victorious Williamites there was no title or estate for him to succeed to.

Lord Dillon, as he was now, was governor of Galway for the Jacobites. Ginkel quickly marched down upon him from Aughrim and invested the town on 18 July. Dillon surrendered on the 26th on terms and marched out with his troops to Limerick. The Williamites laid siege to Limerick in August 1690. During a shelling of the town Dillon's mother Mary lost her life. The siege was lifted at the end of the month but a second siege followed in 1691 and lasted until the Williamite war in Ireland ended with the Treaty of Limerick signed on 8 October 1691.

While many of the Jacobites went into exile at the end of the war, an event called the Flight of the Wild Geese, Dillon stayed in Ireland and applied for the reversal of his attainder, which he obtained in 1694 by a judgement of the Court of the King's Bench and was confirmed by the Irish House of Lords in 1697. He, therefore, got back his title and lands.

== Death, succession, and timeline ==
Dillon died on 13 January 1714 in Dublin and was buried at Ballyhaunis in County Mayo. He was succeeded by his son, Richard, the 9th Viscount, who died in 1737, without male issue, (Note: The dual year 1713/4 given in (Cokayne 1916) makes it clear that the year given in (Burke & Burke 1915) (i.e. 1713) is strict O.S. and becomes 1714 when it is adjusted for a start of the year on 1 January.) and the title passed to his nephew Charles, his brother Arthur's son.

Timeline
The accuracy of the given ages depends on that of his birth (estimated) and those of the dated events.
Age	Date	Event
0	1665, estimate	Born, probably at his parents' house at Kilmore, County Roscommon.
4–5	1670	Brother Arthur was born.
17–18	1683	Father succeeded as the 7th Viscount.
19–20	1685, 6 Feb	Accession of King James II, succeeding King Charles II
21–22	1687, 8 Jan	Richard Talbot, 1st Earl of Tyrconnell, appointed Lord Deputy of Ireland
21–22	1687, Jul	Married Frances Hamilton, step-daughter of Tyrconnell.
23–24	1689, 13 Feb	Accession of William and Mary, succeeding King James II
23–24	1689	Sat in the Patriot Parliament.
25–26	1691, 11 May	Father was attainted by the Williamites.
25–26	1691, 12 Jul	Succeeded as the 8th Viscount as his father was slain at the Battle of Aughrim
25–26	1691, 26 Jul	Surrendered Galway to Ginkel.
28–29	1694	Obtained the reversal of his father's attainder.
36–37	1702, 8 Mar	Accession of Queen Anne, succeeding King William III
48–49	1714, 13 Jan	Died in Dublin and was succeeded by his son Richard as the 9th Viscount.

== Notes and references ==
=== Sources ===
- Bagwell, Richard (1898). "Talbot, Richard, Earl and titular Duke of Tyrconnel (1630–1691)". In Lee, Sidney (ed.). Dictionary of National Biography. Vol. LV. London: Smith, Elder, & Co. pp. 331–336. OCLC 8544105.
- Boulger, Demetrius Charles (1911). The Battle of the Boyne. London: Martin Secker. OCLC 1041056932.
- Burke, Bernard (1869). A Genealogical and Heraldic Dictionary of the Peerage and Baronetage of the British Empire (31st ed.). London: Harrison. OCLC 1045624502. (for siblings Elizabeth, Thomas, John, Lucia, Margaret and daughters)
- Burke, Sir Bernard; Fox-Davies, Arthur Charles (1912). A Genealogical and Heraldic History of the Landed Gentry of Ireland (New ed.). London: Harrison & Sons. OCLC 1045621157.
- Burke, Bernard; Burke, Ashworth Peter (1915). A Genealogical and Heraldic History of the Peerage and Baronetage, the Privy Council, Knightage and Companionage (77th ed.). London: Harrison. OCLC 1155471554.
- Cokayne, George Edward (1916). Gibbs, Vicary (ed.). The complete peerage of England, Scotland, Ireland, Great Britain and the United Kingdom, extant, extinct, or dormant. Vol. IV (2nd ed.). London: St Catherine Press. OCLC 228661424. – Dacre to Dysart (for Dillon)
- D'Alton, John (1855). Illustrations, historical and genealogical, of King James's Irish army list, 1689. Dublin: Published by the author. OCLC 838655763.
- Debrett, John (1828). Peerage of the United Kingdom of Great Britain and Ireland. Vol. II (17th ed.). London: F. C. and J. Rivington. OCLC 54499602. – Scotland and Ireland
- Fryde, E. B.; Greenway, D. E.; Porter, S.; Roy, I., eds. (1986). Handbook of British Chronology. Royal Historical Society Guides and Handbooks, No. 2 (3rd ed.). London: Offices of the Royal Historical Society. ISBN 0-86193-106-8. – (for timeline)
- Hardiman, James (1820). History of the town and county of the town of Galway. Dublin: W. Folds & Sons. OCLC 875131724.
- La Tour du Pin, Henriette-Lucy, Marquise de (1913). Journal d'une femme de cinquante ans [Diary of a Woman in her Fifties] (in French). Vol. I (7th ed.). Paris: Librairie Chapelot. OCLC 1047408815.
- Lodge, John (1789). Archdall, Mervyn (ed.). The Peerage of Ireland or, A Genealogical History of the Present Nobility of that Kingdom. Vol. IV. Dublin: James Moore. OCLC 264906028. – Viscounts (for Dillon)
- Ward, Adolphus William; Prothero, G. W.; Leathes, Stanley, eds. (1908). The Cambridge Modern History. Vol. V. New York: The MacMillan Company. OCLC 63001617. – The Age of Louis XIV
- Webb, Alfred (1878). "Dillon, Theobald, Viscount". Compendium of Irish Biography. Dublin: M. H. Gill & Son. p. 149. OCLC 122693688. (for the 1st viscount)

Peerage of Ireland
Preceded by Theobald Dillon	Viscount Dillon; 1691–1714	Succeeded by Richard Dillon
