= Lucas Dillon of Loughglynn =

Irish Confederate politician (died 1656)

Lucas Dillon
- Born: 1579
- Died: 1656 (aged 76–77)
- Spouse: Jane Moore
- Children: Robert & others
- Parents: Theobald Dillon, 1st Viscount Dillon (father); Eleanor (mother)

Sir Lucas Dillon of Loughglynn (1579–1656) was in 1628 one of the negotiators of the Graces; he was MP for Roscommon in the two Irish Parliaments of Charles I. At the Irish Rebellion of 1641 he sided with the rebels and joined the Irish Catholic Confederation, where he served on the Supreme Council.

== Birth and origins ==
Lucas was born in 1579, the second son of Theobald Dillon and Eleanor Tuite. His father would become the first Viscount Dillon in 1622. His mother was a daughter of Sir Edward Tuite of Tuitestown, County Westmeath, and widow of William Tuite of Monilea. His father's side of the family descended from Lord Dillon of Drumraney, County Westmeath. His father's family was Old English and descended from Sir Henry Dillon who came to Ireland with Prince John in 1185.

Family tree

Theobald Dillon with wife, parents, and other selected relatives. (Note: Also see the lists of siblings and children in the text.)

Thomas; Dillon of Ballynakill	Margery; Dillon of Kilmore
Theobald; 1st Viscount d. 1624	Eleanor; Tuite d. 1638
Christopher; Dillon of Ballylaghan d. 1624 d.v.p.*	Lucas; Dillon; 1579–1656 of Loughglynn	Jane; Moore
Lucas; 2nd Viscount; 1610–1629	Thomas; 4th Viscount; 1615–1673	Theobald; Dillon	Robert D. of Loughglynn	Rose Dillon of Streamstown d. 1681
Theobald; 3rd Viscount; 1629–1630	Thomas; 5th Viscount d. 1674	Lucas; 6th Viscount d. 1682	Theobald; 7th Viscount d. 1691; Jacobite	Mary; Talbot d. 1691

Legend

XXX	Subject of the article	XXX	Viscounts; Dillon

*d.v.p. = predeceased his father (decessit vita patris)

== Marriage and children ==
Lucas Dillon married Jane Moore, daughter of Garret Moore.

Lucas and Jane had four sons:

1. Robert, married Rose Dillon of Streamstown and was the father of the 7th Lord Dillon

Nothing seems to be known of the other sons and of daughters.

== Later life ==
=== The Graces ===
In June 1627 a convention was elected in Ireland that chose 11 agents to be sent to England to negotiate with the King. Sir Lucas was one of them. Three were Protestants, the remaining eight Old English Catholics.

=== Nephew's wardship ===
On 8 December 1630 Sir Lucas bought the wardship of his nephew Thomas Dillon, 4th Viscount Dillon, who was then 15 years old.

=== Parliaments of 1634–1635 and 1640–1649 ===
Sir Lucas sat for County Roscommon in the parliaments of 1634–1635 and the Parliament 1640–1649.

=== Irish Catholic Confederation ===
==== The Cessation ====
On 15 September 1643 at Sigginstown, Strafford's unfinished house, the Confederates signed a cease-fire with Ormond, called the "Cessation". Sir Lucas was one of the signatories for the Confederates. The Confederates agreed to pay the King £30,000 (about £6,000,000 in 2025) in several instalments.

==== Second Ormond Peace ====
n January 1649, the Second Ormond Peace was signed. The Irish Catholic Confederation was dissolved, and power handed to 12 Commissioners of Trust of which Sir Lucas was one. On 2 August Jones defeated the Irish royalists under Ormond, who had been besieging Dublin, at the Battle of Rathmines.

== Death and timeline ==
Dillon died in 1656.

Timeline
As his birth date is uncertain, so are all his ages.
Age	Date	Event
0	1579	Born
2–3	1582	Father made collector-general of the composition money.
19–20	1599, 24 Jul	Father knighted by Essex.
23–24	1603, 24 Mar	Accession of King James I, succeeding Queen Elizabeth I
28–29	1608, 19 Jul	James I Father given a patent for Kilfaughny house.
42–43	1622, 16 Mar	Father created Viscount Dillon of Costello-Gallen.
44–45	1624, 28 Feb	Brother Christopher died.
44–45	1624, 15 Mar	Father died at Kilfaughny and was succeeded by his grandson Lucas.
45–46	1625, 27 Mar	Accession of King Charles I, succeeding King James I
48–49	1628	Sent to England to negotiate the Graces.
63–64	1643, 15 Sep	One of the signatories of the Cessation
69–70	1649, 30 Jan	King Charles I beheaded.
76–77	1656	Died.

== Notes and references ==
=== Sources ===
Subject matter monographs:

- Click here. Murphy in Dictionary of Irish Biography
- Airy, Osmund (1886). "Butler, James, twelfth Earl and first Duke of Ormonde (1610–1688)". In Lee, Sidney (ed.). Dictionary of National Biography. Vol. VIII. New York: MacMillan and Co. pp. 52–60. OCLC 8544105.
- Bagwell, Richard (1909). Ireland under the Stuarts and under the Interregnum. Vol. II. London: Longmans, Green, and Co. OCLC 458582656. – 1642 to 1660
- Clarke, Aidan (1976). "Chapter VIII: Selling Royal Favours, 1624–32". In Moody, Theodore William; Martin, F. X.; Byrne, Francis John (eds.). A New History of Ireland. Vol. III. Oxford: Oxford University Press. pp. 233–242. ISBN 0-19-820242-3. – 1624 to 1632
- Cokayne, George Edward (1916). Gibbs, Vicary (ed.). The complete peerage of England, Scotland, Ireland, Great Britain and the United Kingdom, extant, extinct, or dormant. Vol. IV (2nd ed.). London: St Catherine Press. OCLC 228661424. – Dacre to Dysart (for Dillon)
- Debrett, John (1828). Peerage of the United Kingdom of Great Britain and Ireland. Vol. II (17th ed.). London: F. C. and J. Rivington. OCLC 54499602. – Scotland and Ireland
- Duffy, Seán (2002). The Illustrated History of Ireland. New York: Contemporary Books. ISBN 0-8092-2437-2.
- Fryde, Edmund Boleslaw; Greenway, D. E.; Porter, S.; Roy, I., eds. (1986). Handbook of British Chronology. Royal Historical Society Guides and Handbooks, No. 2 (3rd ed.). London: Offices of the Royal Historical Society. ISBN 0-86193-106-8. – (for timeline)
- Gilbert, John Thomas, ed. (1882). History of the Irish Confederation and the War in Ireland 1641–1643. Vol. I (limited to two hundred copies ed.). Dublin: Printed for the editor by M. H. Gill & Son. OCLC 220683699. – History based on Richard Bellings's memoirs
- Gillespie, Raymond (2006). Seventeenth-Century Ireland: Making Ireland Modern. Dublin: Gill & MacMillan. ISBN 978-0-7171-3946-0.
- House of Commons (1878). Return. Members of Parliament – Part II. Parliaments of Great Britain, 1705–1796. Parliaments of the United Kingdom, 1801–1874. Parliaments and Conventions of the Estates of Scotland, 1357–1707. Parliaments of Ireland, 1599–1800. London: His/Her Majesty's Stationery Office. OCLC 13112546.
- Joyce, Patrick Weston (1903). A Concise History of Ireland from the Earliest Times to 1837 (12th ed.). Dublin: M. H. Gill & Son. OCLC 815623752.
- Lodge, John (1789). Archdall, Mervyn (ed.). The Peerage of Ireland or, A Genealogical History of the Present Nobility of that Kingdom. Vol. IV. Dublin: James Moore. OCLC 264906028. – Viscounts (for Dillon)
- Meehan, Rev. Charles Patrick (1882). The Confederation of Kilkenny (New revised and enlarged ed.). Dublin: James Duffy. OCLC 224157081.
- Moody, Theodore William; Martin, F. X. (2001) [1st pub. 1967]. The Course of Irish History (4th ed.). Oxford: Roberts Rinehart Publishers. ISBN 1-58979-002-2.
- Murphy, Elaine (October 2009). McGuire, James; Quinn, James (eds.). "Dillon, Sir Lucas". Dictionary of Irish Biography.
- Webb, Alfred (1878). "Dillon, Theobald, Viscount". Compendium of Irish Biography. Dublin: M. H. Gill & Son. p. 149. OCLC 122693688.
