= Arthur Dillon, Count Dillon =

French general of Irish origin (1670–1733)

Arthur Dillon
- Born: 1670; County Roscommon, Ireland
- Died: 5 February 1733 (aged 62–63); Château-vieux de Saint-Germain-en-Laye
- Relatives: Theobald, 7th Viscount Dillon (father)
- Military career
- Allegiance: Jacobites; France
- Branch: Jacobite Army; French Army
- Rank: Lieutenant général (French Army)
- Conflicts: Williamite War in Ireland; Nine Years' War (1688–1697); War of the Spanish Succession (1701–1714)

Arthur Dillon, Count Dillon (1670–1733) was a Jacobite soldier from Ireland who served as colonel of Dillon's Regiment in the Irish Brigade in French service. He fought in the Nine Years' War and in the War of the Spanish Succession where he excelled at the Battle of Cremona against Prince Eugene of Savoy.

== Birth and origins ==
Family tree

Arthur Dillon with wife, parents, and other selected relatives. (Note: This family tree is partly derived from the Dillon family tree pictured in La Tour du Pin. Also see the list of children in the text.)

Robert; Dillon of Loughglynn	Rose D. of Streamstown d. 1681
Theobald; 7th Viscount d. 1691; Jacobite	Mary; Talbot d. 1691
Henry; 8th Viscount d. 1714	Arthur; 1670–1733	Christina; Sheldon; 1684–1757
Richard; 9th Viscount; 1688–1737	Charles; 10th Viscount; 1701–1741	Henry; 11th Viscount; 1705–1787	Charlotte; Lee d. 1794; Heiress
Charles; 12th Viscount; 1745–1813	Henrietta- Maria; Phipps; 1757–1782	Arthur; 1750–1794; French general

Legend

XXX	Subject of the article	XXX	Viscounts; Dillon

Arthur was born in 1670 in County Roscommon, Ireland, probably at Kilmore, his parents' habitual residence. He was the third son of Theobald Dillon and his wife Mary Talbot. His father was the 7th Viscount Dillon of Costello-Gallen and supported James II in the Williamite war in Ireland. His father's family was descended from Anglo-Norman settlers in Ireland and descended from Sir Henry De lion (a name that became Dillon in later generations), who came to Ireland with Prince John in 1185.

Henry's mother was a daughter of Sir Henry Talbot of Templeogue and his wife Margaret Talbot, who was a sister of Richard Talbot, 1st Earl of Tyrconnell. The Talbots also were Old English.

Both his parents were Catholic. He was one of eight siblings, who are listed in his father's article. His elder brother Henry would succeed as the 8th Viscount Dillon.

== Early life ==
In 1688 his father raised two regiments for James II, one commanded by his son Henry, the other by his son Arthur, the subject of this article. In 1690 James II and Louis XIV agreed that an Irish Brigade of 5,400 men would be sent to France in exchange for six French regiments sent to Ireland with Lauzun. Arthur Dillon's Regiment was part of this Irish Brigade, which was led by Lord Mountcashel. Arthur, aged 20, landed with it at Brest on 1 May 1690.

Both his parents were killed in the Williamite war. His father fell at the Battle of Aughrim on 12 July 1691, whereas his mother was killed during the second Siege of Limerick by a shell fired into the town on 7 September 1691.

At that time France was in the middle of the Nine Years' War (1688–97) of which the Williamite War in Ireland had been a theatre. Dillon and his regiment were sent to Roussillon and Catalonia, another theatre of this same war, where they fought the Spanish, among others at the siege of Roses under the Duc de Noailles, in 1693. In 1695 the duc de Vendôme succeeded to Noailles. Vendôme besieged Barcelona, which was defended by its governor, the Conde de la Corzana, and by Prince George of Hesse-Darmstadt. The town surrendered on terms after a siege of 52 days on 10 August 1697.

== Marriage and children ==
The Nine Years' War ended in 1697 with the Treaty of Ryswick and four years of peace followed. Dillon found the time to marry. His chosen wife was Christina Sheldon, a maid-of-honour to Mary of Modena, queen consort of James II of England. Christina's parents were Ralph Sheldon of Ditchford, Worcestershire (1633–1723) and Elisabeth, heiress of Daniel Dunn of Garnish Hall in Essex. Dominic Sheldon, the Jacobite general, was her uncle. Her family was English and Catholic. She continued to serve Mary of Modena as lady-in-waiting at the Château de Saint-Germain-en-Laye.

Arthur and Christina had five sons:

1. Charles (1701–1741), became the 10th Viscount Dillon
2. Henry (1705–1787), became the 11th Viscount Dillon
3. James (died 1745), became Colonel of Dillon's Regiment and fell in the Battle of Fontenoy
4. Edward (1720–1747), succeeded his brother as Colonel of the Dillon Regiment and then fell in the Battle of Lauffeld
5. Arthur Richard (1721–1806), became a French archbishop

—and five daughters:

1. Frances, became a Carmelite nun
2. Catharine (died 1753), became a Carmelite nun and died at St. Denis
3. Mary (died 1786), died at St Germain
4. Bridget (died 1785), married Baron Blaisel, a Lieutenant-General in the French Army
5. Laura (died 1741), married Lucius Cary, 6th Viscount Falkland, a Jacobite

== War of the Spanish Succession ==
The War of the Spanish Succession (1701–1714) broke out after Charles II of Spain, the last Habsburg king of Spain, died without heir. Dillon and his regiment were first sent to the Rhine in 1701 where he served under François de Neufville, duc de Villeroy, but Villeroy and Dillon were soon transferred to northern Italy where France and its ally Savoy were trying to seize the Duchy of Milan, which belonged to Spain. French troops under the command of Marshal Nicolas Catinat fought the Austrians under Prince Eugene of Savoy. However, after Catinat lost the skirmish of Carpi on 9 July 1701, the command of the French troops in Italy was given to Villeroy under whom Catinat then served as second in command. On 1 September 1701 Prince Eugene defeated Villeroy at Chiari.

On 16 September 1701 James II died at Saint-Germain-en-Laye and was succeeded by James Francis Edward Stuart, James III for the Jacobites, the Old Pretender for the supporters of William III in England, who was succeeded by Queen Anne on 8 March 1702.

Eugene's next move in northern Italy was to surprise Villeroy in his winter quarters in Cremona on the night of 31 January to 1 February 1702, an action also called the Battle of Cremona. Villeroy was taken prisoner, but the French were saved from defeat by Dillon's and Bourke's Irish regiments, who held the Po-gate and the bridge over the River Po against the Austrians, thus preventing Eugene from effecting his junction with the troops he had on the other side of the river. Eventually, Eugene could not hold the town against its garrison and had to retreat.

Villeroy was replaced with the duc de Vendôme, under whom Dillon had already served at Barcelona. Under Vendôme Dillon and his regiment fought in the battles of Santa-Vittoria on 26 July 1702, and Luzzara on 15 August 1702. On 1 October 1702 Dillon was promoted to brigadier. In 1703 Vendôme tried to effect a junction with the Bavarians, allied with the French against Austria, through the Tyrol and penetrated as far as Trent. Dillon took the town of Riva at the northern tip of Lake Garda. However, on 13 August 1704 Marlborough and Eugene beat the French and Bavarians at Blenheim. Savoy switched side and Vendôme had to retreat. In 1704 Dillon, aged 34, was promoted to maréchal de camp. On 16 August 1705 Vendôme repulsed Eugene at Cassano. Three Irish regiments, including Dillon's, played a key-role in halting Eugene's attack. Dillon was made a commander of the Order of Saint Louis.

On 23 May 1706 Marlborough beat Villeroy at Ramillies in the Spanish Netherlands. Thereupon, Louis XIV ordered Vendôme with a big part of the Armée d'Italie to Flanders to redress the situation there. Dillon and his regiment stayed behind in Northern Italy. Philippe II, Duke of Orléans, who would rule France as Regent from 1715 to 1723, replaced Vendôme in Italy, taking up his new position in July.

Together with Jacques Eléonor Rouxel de Grancey, comte de Médavy, Dillon defeated at the Battle of Castiglione on 9 September 1706 a Hessian unit under Prince Frederick of Hesse-Kassel that had arrived too late from Germany to join the main body of Eugene's army. Their victory had no effect, because the day before the French lost the decisive Battle of Turin (7 September 1706) and had to evacuate northern Italy.

On 24 September 1706 Dillon was promoted to lieutenant général for his action at Castiglione. Under Marshal Tessé (Note: René must not be confused with his younger brother Philibert-Emmanuel de Froulay, chevalier de Tessé, who fought in Ireland during the Williamite war.) Dillon and his regiment participated in the successful defence of Toulon in the Siege of Toulon (1707). In 1707 Austria signed the Convention of Milan ending the war in northern Italy.

in 1708 Dillon's regiment was transferred to the Moselle where Dillon served under Claude Louis Hector de Villars and James FitzJames, 1st Duke of Berwick.

In 1709 Berwick, and Dillon with him, were transferred to the Dauphiné to guard this French province against attacks from neighbouring Savoy. Dillon defended Briançon and on 28 August 1709 defeated Bernhard Otto von Rehbinder, a Baltic German in Savoyard service, at the Pont de la Vachette. It was rumoured that while in Grenoble Dillon had an affair with Claudine Guérin de Tencin who was at that time a nun at the convent of Montfleury at Corenc near Grenoble. She managed to leave her nunnery in 1712.

In 1711 Dillon was created comte Dillon in France by Louis XIV. commander

In 1712, when the French opened peace talks with the English, James Francis Edward was told to leave France. He decided to take refuge in Lorraine (not yet part of France at that time). He left Saint-Germain-en-Laye on 6 September 1712 and arrived in Lorraine in February 1713 after a short stay in Châlons-sur-Marne.

The Peace of Utrecht on 11 April 1713 ended the war between France on one hand and Britain, the Netherlands, and Savoy on the other hand. In the treaty, France recognised the Hanoverian Succession and formally ended its support for the Jacobites.

However, the war between France and Austria continued. Comte Dillon, as he was now, was transferred from the Dauphiné to the Rhine for the campaign of 1713, where he served under Villars capturing Kaiserslautern on 24 June 1713 and the Castle Wolfstein. He then participated in the siege of Landau, 24 June to 26 August 1713, under Marshall Jacques Bazin de Bezons and in the siege of Freiburg, 20 September to 17 November 1713. The Treaty of Rastatt on 17 March 1714 ended the war with Austria.

However, the war still raged on in Spain where Catalonia tried to preserve Catalan autonomy by supporting Charles III against Philip V as Spanish King. Dillon was transferred to Spain under the command of Berwick where he returned to sit before Barcelona as he had done already in 1697. This Siege of Barcelona (1713-1714) was his last campaign. The town was stormed on 11 September 1714 and capitulated on the 12.

== Later life ==
Count Dillon was later appointed commander in the Dauphiné and governor of Toulon.

As a French General, Dillon was not allowed to participate in the Jacobite rising of 1715. Returning from Scotland following the failure of the rising, James Francis Edward found himself not welcome in Lorraine anymore and established himself at Avignon on 2 April 1716. On 1 February 1717 he appointed Dillon his plenipotentiary to the French court in Paris. In this role Dillon, together with Georg Heinrich von Görtz, and Carl Gyllenborg tried to convince Charles XII of Sweden to help the Jacobites to invade England. Dillon organised funds to support the project.

In 1718 Dillon was ordered to command a French contingent sent to Italy during the War of the Quadruple Alliance (1718–1720). He was replaced as agent in Paris initially by James Murray and later by Daniel O'Brien.

James Francis Edward, whom Dillon recognised as King James III, awarded him the Irish titles of Baron and Viscount on 1 February 1717 in Avignon. James III neglected to specify territorial designations for these titles. In 1721 James III gave him Scottish titles by creating him Earl Dillon, also Viscount and Lord. In 1722 he was made a (Jacobite) Knight of the Thistle.

He was also a grandfather of the French generals Arthur Dillon and Théobald Dillon. He was a cousin of Gerard Lally. He was a great-grandfather of the famous memoirist Henriette-Lucy, Marquise de La Tour du Pin Gouvernet, née Henriette-Lucy Dillon.

In 1730 he retired from active service, handing over the command of the regiment to Charles, his eldest son.

== Death, succession, and timeline ==
On 5 February 1733 N.S., Arthur Dillon, comte de Dillon, died at the Château de Saint-Germain-en-Laye. His eldest son Charles, already colonel, now also succeeded to his father's titles: comte de Dillon in France and Earl of Dillon in the Jacobite peerage.

Timeline
As only the year but not the day of his birth is known, all ages could be a year younger.
Age	Date	Event
0	1670	Born in Ireland.
18–19	1689, 13 Feb	Accession of William and Mary, succeeding King James II
19–20	1690, 1 May	Debarked at Brest with the regiment.
20–21	1691, 12 Jul	Father fell at the Battle of Aughrim.
20–21	1691, 7 Sep	Mother killed during the Siege of Limerick.
26–27	1697, 10 Aug	Fought at the Siege of Barcelona.
26–27	1697, Oct	The Peace of Ryswick ended the Nine Years' War.
30–31	1701, 16 Sep	James II died at Saint-Germain-en-Laye and was succeeded by James Francis Edward.
31–32	1702, 1 Feb	Fought at Cremona
31–32	1702, 8 Mar	Accession of Queen Anne, succeeding King William III
33–34	1704	Made maréchal de camp
33–34	1704, 13 Aug	Battle of Blenheim
35–36	Sep	Victorious in the Battle of Castiglione
35–36	1706, 26 Sep	Made lieutenant-général.
38–39	1709, 28 Aug	Defeated Rehbinder at Vachette near Briançon.
40–41	1711	Created "comte de Dillon" in France by Louis XIV
40–41	1711	Made a commander of the Order of Saint Louis
42–43	1713, Feb	James Francis Edward moves to Avignon.
42–43	1713, 11 Apr	The Peace of Utrecht ended the War of the Spanish Succession and France drops the Jacobites.
42–43	1713, 24 Jun	Besieged and took Kaiserslautern
43–44	1714, 1 Aug	Accession of King George I, succeeding Queen Anne
43–44	1715, 1 Sep	Death of Louis XIV; Regency until the majority of Louis XV
52–53	1723, 16 Feb	Majority of Louis XV
59–60	1730	Retired from active service and handed the regiment over to Charles, his eldest son
62–63	1733, 5 Feb N.S.	Died at the Château-vieux de Saint-Germain-en-Laye

== Notes and references ==
=== Sources ===
- Boulger, Demetrius Charles (1911). The Battle of the Boyne. London: Martin Secker. OCLC 1041056932.
- Burke, Sir Bernard; Fox-Davies, Arthur Charles (1912). A Genealogical and Heraldic History of the Landed Gentry of Ireland (New ed.). London: Harrison & Sons. OCLC 1045621157.
- Burke, Bernard; Burke, Ashworth Peter (1915). A Genealogical and Heraldic History of the Peerage and Baronetage, the Privy Council, Knightage and Companionage (77th ed.). London: Harrison. OCLC 1155471554.
- Cokayne, George Edward (1916). Gibbs, Vicary (ed.). The complete peerage of England, Scotland, Ireland, Great Britain and the United Kingdom, extant, extinct, or dormant. Vol. IV (2nd ed.). London: St Catherine Press. OCLC 228661424. – Dacre to Dysart
- D'Alton, John (1855). Illustrations, historical and genealogical, of King James's Irish army list, 1689. Dublin: Published by the author. OCLC 838655763. (For Dillon)
- Debrett, John (1828). Peerage of the United Kingdom of Great Britain and Ireland. Vol. II (17th ed.). London: F. C. and J. Rivington. OCLC 54499602. – Scotland and Ireland (for Dillon)
- Fryde, Edmund Boleslaw; Greenway, D. E.; Porter, S.; Roy, I., eds. (1986). Handbook of British Chronology. Royal Historical Society Guides and Handbooks, No. 2 (3rd ed.). London: Offices of the Royal Historical Society. ISBN 0-86193-106-8. – (for timeline)
- Goubert, Pierre (1984). Initiation à l'histoire de la France (in French). Paris: Fayard-Tallandier. ISBN 978-2-235-01484-7.
- Gregg, Edward (2004). "James Francis Edward". In Matthew, Colin; Harrison, Brian (eds.). Oxford Dictionary of National Biography. Vol. 29. New York: Oxford University Press. pp. 673–678. ISBN 0-19-861379-2.
- Hollensteiner, Carl (1860). Kaiserslautern, wie es war – wie es ist – was es litt [Kaiserslautern, as it was – what it suffered] (in German). Kaiserslautern: J. Kayser. OCLC 7294370.
- Jullien de Courcelles, Jean Baptiste Pierre (1822). Dictionnaire historique et biographique des généraux français [Historic and Biographic Dictionary of French Generals] (in French). Vol. Tome cinquième. Paris: chez l'auteur. OCLC 1071691485. – Coss to Exc
- La Chesnaye des Bois, François Alexandre Aubert de (1863). Dictionnaire de la noblesse (in French). Vol. Tome troisième (3rd ed.). Paris: Schlesinger Frères. OCLC 797014713. – BER to BRA
- La Chesnaye des Bois, François Alexandre Aubert de (1865). Dictionnaire de la noblesse (in French). Vol. Tome sixième (3rd ed.). Paris: Schlesinger Frères. OCLC 797014713. – COE to DOU
- La Tour du Pin, Henriette-Lucy, Marquise de (1913). Journal d'une femme de cinquante ans [Diary of a Woman in her Fifties] (in French). Vol. I (7th ed.). Paris: Librairie Chapelot. OCLC 1047408815.
- Lodge, John (1789). Archdall, Mervyn (ed.). The Peerage of Ireland or, A Genealogical History of the Present Nobility of that Kingdom. Vol. IV. Dublin: James Moore. OCLC 264906028. – Viscounts (for Dillon)
- Lynn, John A. (1999). The Wars of Louis XIV 1667–1714. Harlow, England: Longman. ISBN 978-0-582-05629-9.
- Miller, Peggy (1971). James: Old Pretender. Lanham MD: St. Martin's Press. ISBN 9780049230569.
- Murtagh, Harman (2004). "Dillon, Arthur, Jacobite, Earl Dillon (1670–1733)". In Matthew, Colin; Harrison, Brian (eds.). Oxford Dictionary of National Biography. Vol. 16. New York: Oxford University Press. pp. 199–200. ISBN 0-19-861366-0.
- O'Callaghan, John Cornelius (1854). History of the Irish Brigades in the Service of France. New York: P. O'Shea Publisher. OCLC 1046538374.
- Quincy, Charles Sevin de (1726a). Histoire militaire du règne de Louis le Grand [Military History of the Reign of Louis the Great] (in French). Vol. III. Paris: Denis Mariette. OCLC 312096140. – 1694 to 1702
- Quincy, Charles Sevin de (1726b). Histoire militaire du règne de Louis le Grand [Military History of the Reign of Louis the Great] (in French). Vol. V. Paris: Denis Mariette. OCLC 312096192. – 1706 to 1708
- Ruvigny, Melville Henry, Marquis de (1904). Jacobite Peerage Baronetage Knightage and Grants of Honour. Edinburgh: T C & E C Jack. OCLC 655825906.
- Saint-Hilaire, Armand de Mormès, seigneur de (1911). Lecestre, Léon (ed.). Mémoires de Saint-Hilaire (in French). Vol. Tome quatrième. Paris: Librairie Renouard. OCLC 1049621979. – 1704 to 1706
- Saint-Hilaire, Armand de Mormès, seigneur de (1914). Lecestre, Léon (ed.). Mémoires de Saint-Hilaire (in French). Vol. Tome cinquième. Paris: Librairie Renouard. OCLC 1049698378. – 1707 to 1710
- Saint-Hilaire, Armand de Mormès, seigneur de (1916). Lecestre, Léon (ed.). Mémoires de Saint-Hilaire (in French). Vol. Tome sixième. Paris: Librairie Renouard. OCLC 1049683465. – 1711 to 1715
- Webb, Alfred (1878a). "Dillon, Arthur, Count". Compendium of Irish Biography. Dublin: M. H. Gill & Son. p. 150. OCLC 122693688.
- Webb, Alfred (1878b). "Dillon, Theobald, Viscount". Compendium of Irish Biography. Dublin: M. H. Gill & Son. p. 149. OCLC 122693688.

Peerage of Scotland
New creation	— TITULAR — Earl of Dillon; Jacobite peerage 1721–1733	Succeeded by Charles Dillon
Peerage of Ireland
New creation	— TITULAR — Viscount Dillon; Jacobite peerage 1717–1733	Succeeded by Charles Dillon
