= Cecily Dillon =

Poor Clare abbess (c. 1603–1653)

Personal life
- Born: c. 1603 Kellefaghny, County Westmeath, Ireland
- Died: 1653 (aged 49–50) coast of Spain

Religious life
- Religion: Christian
- Order: Poor Clares

Sister Cecily Dillon (c. 1603 – 1653) was an Irish co-foundress and first abbess of the Irish Poor Clares in Dublin, Ballinacliffey and Athlone.

== Early life ==
Cecily Dillon was born around 1603, most likely in Kellefaghny, County Westmeath. She was the daughter of Theobald Dillon, 1st Viscount Dillon and Eleanor (née Tuite). Dillon was one of their 19 children, including her brothers Lucas Dillon and James Dillon. Along with her older sister, Eleanor, Dillon was one of the first Irishwomen to join the English Poor Clares at Gravelines in Flanders. Dillon professed as Sister Cecily of St Francis on 8 September 1622.

== Religious life ==
Dillon left Gravelines with three other Irish nuns in May 1625 to found an Irish convent at Dunkirk, with Eleanor as abbess. In 1627, they moved to Nieuwpoort to found a community there. They wanted to return to Ireland, and with help from the Irish Franciscan priests and their brothers George and Louis, the first Poor Clare convent was established in Dublin in June 1629 with Dillon as abbess. Eleanor had died soon after their return to Dublin. As their brother Lucas was a member of the Irish privy council, the convent was able to withstand the suppression of religious houses at the time. However, on 22 October 1630 their convent was raided and ordered to disband. The nuns went to stay at Sir Lucas's estate in County Westmeath temporarily instead of disbanding. The sisters established a new convent on the Dillon estate at Ballinacliffey on Lough Ree in 1631 which was known as Bethlehem. Six of Dillon's nieces joined the order, including the daughters of the lords Westmeath, Fingall and Gormanston.

In late 1641 when rebellion broke out in Ireland, the sisters evacuated their convent. It was raided and burned in 1642, with the sisters sheltering with their relatives and friends. The community had over 30 sisters at this time, with some moving to County Galway, and four moving to Wexford. Dillon remained in Athlone until 1653, being re-elected abbess at least five times. When Oliver Cromwell declared that all nuns were "to marry or leave the country" in 1653, Dillon led a group of nuns to Spain where they believed they would be welcomed into religious houses there. However, when they arrived at Galicia, their ship was quarantined and they were not allowed to land. While on board the ship, Dillon became sick and died, and is buried in Spain.
