= Charles Dillon, 10th Viscount Dillon =

French soldier and Irish lord (1701–1741)

Charles Dillon
- Viscount Dillon
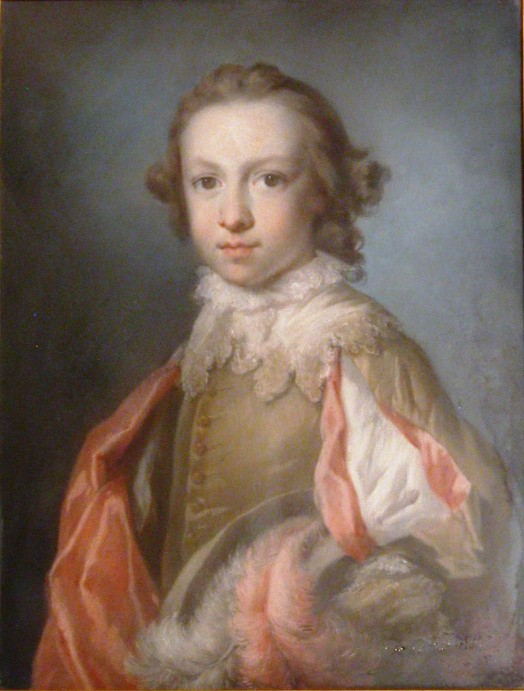
- Tenure: 1737–1741
- Predecessor: Richard, 9th Viscount Dillon
- Successor: Henry, 11th Viscount Dillon
- Born: 1701; Saint-Germain-en-Laye, Yvelines, Île-de-France, Kingdom of France
- Died: 24 October 1741 (aged 39–40); London, England
- Spouse: Frances Dillon
- Issue Detail: Charles Dillon
- Father: Arthur Dillon, Count Dillon
- Mother: Christina Sheldon
- Occupation: colonel-proprietor of Dillon's Regiment

Charles Dillon, 10th Viscount Dillon (1701–1741), an heir from an exiled Irish Jacobite family, fought in the War of the Polish Succession for France under Berwick as colonel-proprietor of Dillon's Regiment at the Siege of Kehl in 1733 and the Siege of Philippsburg in 1734. After the armistice, he married, moved to Ireland, and succeeded his cousin Richard as the 10th Viscount Dillon.

== Birth and origins ==
Charles was born in 1701, most likely at the Jacobite court at the Château de Saint-Germain-en-Laye, in France. He was the eldest of the five sons of Arthur Dillon and his wife Christina Sheldon. His father was born in 1670 in Ireland, fought for the Jacobites in the Williamite War and had gone to France as the colonel of Dillon's Regiment with the Irish Brigade in April 1690 when Irish troops were sent to France in exchange for French troops sent to Ireland with Lauzun. His father was a younger son of the 7th Viscount Dillon. His father's family was Old English Irish and descended from Sir Henry Dillon who came to Ireland with Prince John in 1185.

Charles's mother's first name is given as Christina or as Christiana. She was a daughter of Ralph Sheldon. Dominic Sheldon, the English Catholic Jacobite, was her uncle. She was a maid of honour to Queen Mary of Modena, wife of James II. Both parents were thus Jacobites and Catholics. Charles had four brothers and three sisters, who are listed in his father's article.

Family tree

Charles Dillon with wife, son, parents, and other selected relatives. (Note: This family tree is partly derived from the Dillon family tree pictured in La Tour du Pin. Also see the lists of siblings and children in the text.)

Theobald; 7th Viscount d. 1691; Jacobite	Mary; Talbot d. 1691
Henry; 8th Viscount d. 1714
Richard; 9th Viscount; 1688–1737	Bridget; Bourke d. 1779	Arthur; 1670–1733; French; General	Christina; Sheldon; 1684–1757
Frances; Dillon d. 1739	Charles; 10th Viscount; 1701–1741	Henry; 11th Viscount; 1705–1787
Charles; Dillon; 1738–1739	Charles; 12th Viscount; 1745–1813	Henrietta- Maria; Phipps; 1757–1782	Arthur; 1750–1794; French; General
Henry; Augustus; 13th Viscount; 1777–1832	Henrietta; Browne; 1789–1862

Legend

XXX	Subject of the article	XXX	Viscounts; Dillon

== Early life and career ==
While Charles was a child, he lived with his mother at the Jacobite court at the Château de Saint-Germain-en-Laye where James II of England died on 16 September 1701 N.S., the year of Charles's birth. James II was succeeded by James Francis Edward Stuart, whom Louis XIV immediately recognised as James III and VIII, the rightful heir to the thrones of England, Scotland and Ireland. Dillon's Regiment, led by Charles's father, fought for France in the War of the Spanish Succession (1701–1714). Louis XIV made Charles's father lieutenant-general in 1706 and comte de Dillon in 1711. However, in 1713 France signed the Peace of Utrecht, recognising the Hanoverian succession and ending its support for the Jacobites. James Francis Edward had to leave France and went to the Duchy of Lorraine, then to Avignon, and finally to Italy. His mother, the dowager queen Mary of Modena, however, stayed behind at Saint-Germain-en-Laye where she died in 1718.

On 13 January 1714 Charles's uncle Henry, the 8th Viscount Dillon, died in Ireland. (Note: (Burke & Burke 1915) gives 13 January 1713, but (Cokayne 1916) gives 13 January 1713/4.) This uncle had been attainted as Jacobite in 1690 but had been pardoned and had obtained the reversal of the attainder in 1693. He was succeeded by his son Richard as the 9th Viscount Dillon, to whom Charles would succeed later as the 10th Viscount.

On 10 November 1718, Charles was made a captain in the regiment. In 1722 James Francis Edward Stuart (the old pretender), who now resided in Rome, created his father Earl of Dillon.

In 1730 his father retired from active service and on 1 May 1730 Charles became colonel of Dillon's Regiment. On 5 February 1733 N.S., Charles's father died at the Château de Saint-Germain-en-Laye. Charles, already colonel, now also succeeded in his father's titles: 2nd Earl of Dillon in the Jacobite peerage and comte de Dillon in France. (Note: Arthur Dillon is called "comte" in the Dictionnaire général de biographie but not in the Dictionnaire de la noblesse where the family nevertheless has an article.)

During the War of the Polish Succession (1733–1735), the comte de Dillon, as he now was, and his younger brother Henry fought under Marshal Berwick, the commander of Louis XV's Rhine army. They fought at the Siege of Kehl, which fell on 28 October 1733. In the campaign of 1734 they undertook the Siege of Philippsburg. On 12 June 1734 Berwick was beheaded by a chance cannonball before Philippsburg and was replaced by Asfeld and Noailles, who shared the command of the army before Philippsburg. The fortress surrendered on 18 July 1734.

== Later life: marriage and viscountcy ==
On 16 January 1735 Charles, comte de Dillon, married Frances Dillon, daughter of his first cousin Richard Dillon, the 9th Viscount. In 1736 he went to Ireland to take possession of some land that was part of her dowry. His wife must have come with him or joined him later. They never returned to France. His absence from the regiment did not pose a problem at that time as the War of the Polish Succession had ended in 1735 with an armistice and France was to enjoy peace until it became seriously involved in the War of the Austrian Succession with Maurice de Saxe's raid on Prague in 1741.

In 1737 Richard, the 9th Viscount, his father-in-law, died and Charles, already comte and earl, succeeded as the 10th Viscount Dillon in the Irish peerage. As his wife was Richard's only heiress, Charles, Viscount Dillon, as he now was, also inherited the land.

Charles and Frances had an only son:

- Charles Dillon (1738–1739), died young

His wife died on 17 January 1739 in London.

=== Death, succession, and timeline ===
He died on 24 October 1741, aged 40, also in London and was buried in St Pancras cemetery where Catholics were usually buried in London. As his only son had predeceased him, he was succeeded by his younger brother Henry as the 11th Viscount, and also as colonel-proprietor of Dillon's Regiment.

Timeline
The accuracy of the given ages depends on that of his birth (only the year is known) and those of the dated events.
Age	Date	Event
0	1701	Born, probably at the Château de Saint-Germain-en-Laye.
0	1701, 16 Sep	James II died at the Château de Saint-Germain-en-Laye.
9–10	1711	Father was created comte de Dillon by Louis XIV.
12–13	1714, 13 Jan	His uncle Henry, the 8th Viscount, died in Dublin and was succeeded by his son Richard as the 9th Viscount.
12–13	1714, 1 Aug	Accession of King George I, succeeding Queen Anne
12–13	1715, 1 Sep	Death of Louis XIV; Regency until the majority of Louis XV
16–17	1718, 10 Nov	Made a captain in the regiment.
20–21	1722	Father created Earl of Dillon by James Francis Edward Stuart (the old pretender).
21–22	1723, 16 Feb	Majority of Louis XV
25–26	1727, 11 Jun	Accession of King George II, succeeding King George I
28–29	1730	Became colonel of Dillon's Regiment as his father retired
31–32	1733, 5 Feb N.S.	Father died at the Château de Saint-Germain-en-Laye and he succeeded to his French and Jacobite titles.
31–32	1733, 14–28 Oct	Fought at the Siege of Kehl during the War of the Polish Succession
32–33	1734, May–Jul	Fought at the Siege of Philippsburg during the War of the Polish Succession
33–34	1735, 16 Jan	Married his Irish cousin, Frances Dillon, daughter of his cousin Richard Dillon, the 9th Viscount.
35–36	1737, Feb	Succeeded his cousin Richard as the 10th Viscount.
37–38	1739, 17 Jan	Wife died in London.
39–40	1741, 24 Oct	Died in London and was succeeded by his younger brother Henry as the 11th Viscount

== Notes and references ==
=== Sources ===
- Burke, Bernard; Burke, Ashworth Peter (1915). A Genealogical and Heraldic History of the Peerage and Baronetage, the Privy Council, Knightage and Companionage (77th ed.). London: Harrison. OCLC 1155471554.
- Cokayne, George Edward (1916). Gibbs, Vicary (ed.). The complete peerage of England, Scotland, Ireland, Great Britain and the United Kingdom, extant, extinct, or dormant. Vol. IV (2nd ed.). London: St Catherine Press. OCLC 228661424. – Dacre to Dysart (for Dillon)
- Cust, Edward (1857). Annals of the Wars of the eighteenth Century. Vol. I (3rd ed.). London: John Murray. OCLC 1154001089. – 1700 to 1739 (for Philippsburg)
- Debrett, John (1828a). Peerage of the United Kingdom of Great Britain and Ireland. Vol. I (17th ed.). London: F. C. and J. Rivington. OCLC 54499602. – England (for the dowager queen)
- Debrett, John (1828b). Peerage of the United Kingdom of Great Britain and Ireland. Vol. II (17th ed.). London: F. C. and J. Rivington. OCLC 54499602. – Scotland and Ireland (for Dillon)
- Dezobry, Charles; Bachelet, Théodore (1869). Dictionnaire général de biographie et d'histoire [General Dictionary of Biography and History] (in French). Vol. Première partie (Cinquième edition revue ed.). Paris: Delagrave. OCLC 1040554696. – A to J
- Dyer, Thomas Henry (1877). Modern Europe from the Fall of Constantinople to the Establishment of the German Empire. Vol. IV (2nd ed.). London: George Bell and Sons. OCLC 474524732. – 1714 to 1796 (for the sieges of Kehl and Philippsburg)
- Fryde, Edmund Boleslaw; Greenway, D. E.; Porter, S.; Roy, I., eds. (1986). Handbook of British Chronology. Royal Historical Society Guides and Handbooks, No. 2 (3rd ed.). London: Offices of the Royal Historical Society. ISBN 0-86193-106-8. – (for timeline)
- Gerba, Raimund (1891). Feldzüge des Prinzen Eugen von Savoyen [Campaigns of Prince Eugene of Savoy] (in German). Vol. XIX. Vienna: Verlag des K. und K. Generalstabes. OCLC 312402367. – 1733 & 1734
- Goubert, Pierre (1984). Initiation à l'histoire de la France [Initiation to the History of France] (in French). Paris: Fayard-Tallandier. ISBN 978-2-235-01484-7.
- Handley, Stuart (2004). "FitzJames, James (1650/51–1712)". In Matthew, Colin; Harrison, Brian (eds.). Oxford Dictionary of National Biography. Vol. 19. New York: Oxford University Press. pp. 881–884. ISBN 0-19-861369-5.
- La Chesnaye des Bois, François Alexandre Aubert de (1865). Dictionnaire de la noblesse [Dictionary of Nobility] (in French). Vol. Tome sixième (3rd ed.). Paris: Schlesinger Frères. OCLC 797014713. – COE to DOU (for Dillon)
- La Tour du Pin, Henriette-Lucy, Marquise de (1913). Journal d'une femme de cinquante ans (in French). Vol. 1 (7th ed.). Paris: Librairie Chapelot. OCLC 1047408815.
- Lodge, John (1789). Archdall, Mervyn (ed.). The Peerage of Ireland or, A Genealogical History of the Present Nobility of that Kingdom. Vol. 4. Dublin: James Moore. OCLC 264906028. – Viscounts (for Dillon)
- Miller, Peggy (1971). James: Old Pretender. Lanham MD: St. Martin's Press. ISBN 9780049230569.
- O'Callaghan, John Cornelius (1854). History of the Irish Brigades in the Service of France. New York: P. O'Shea Publisher. OCLC 1046538374.
- Palmer, Samuel (1870). St Pancras: Being Antiquarian Topographic and Biographic Memoranda. London: Samuel Palmer. OCLC 1040544139.
- Ruvigny, Melville Henry, Marquis de (1904). Jacobite Peerage Baronetage Knightage and Grants of Honour. Edinburgh: T C & E C Jack. OCLC 655825906.
- Skrine, Francis Henry (1906). Fontenoy and Great Britain's Share in the war of the Austrian Succession 1741–48. Edinburgh & London: William Blackwood & Sons. OCLC 794042604.
- Webb, Alfred (1878). "Dillon, Theobald, Viscount". Compendium of Irish Biography. Dublin: M. H. Gill & Son. p. 149. OCLC 122693688.

Peerage of Ireland
Preceded by Richard Dillon	Viscount Dillon; 1737–1741	Succeeded by Henry Dillon
