= Eleanor Dillon =

Personal life
- Born: c. 1601 Killenfaghny, County Westmeath, Ireland
- Died: 1629 (aged 27–28) Merchants' Quay, Dublin

Religious life
- Religion: Christian
- Order: Poor Clares

Sister Eleanor Dillon (c. 1601 – 1629) was an Irish abbess and co-foundress of the Poor Clares in Ireland.

== Life ==
Eleanor Mary Dillon was born around 1601 in Killenfaghny, County Westmeath. Her parents were Theobald Dillon, 1st Viscount Dillon and Eleanor (née Tuite). She had four sisters and seven brothers including Lucas, James, and Cecily Dillon. She entered the English Poor Clares at Gravelines in Flanders with her sister and was professed, alongside her sister, on 8 September 1622 as Sister Eleanor Mary of St Joseph. Dillon led a group of five young Irish nuns from Gravelines for Dunkirk in 1625, to found the first convent for Irish women since the suppression of the monasteries. Due to high rents, the group only remained in Dunkirk for a short time, leaving for Nieuport in Flanders in 1626 and founding a convent there in early 1627.

At this point Dillon's brothers, Louis and George who were both priests, suggested that both Dillon sisters return to Ireland to found a convent there. At this time, Catholics were being treated less harshly by the English authorities, which saw a number of religious establishments. The Dillon sisters arrived in Ireland around 13 June 1629, and established the first Poor Clares convent in Ireland at Merchants' Quay in Dublin with Dillon as the abbess. The exact date of Dillon's death is unknown, but she died in 1629 as the convent was established, leading to her sister taking her place as abbess.
