= Theobald Dillon, 7th Viscount Dillon =

Irish Jacobite (died 1691)

Theobald Dillon
- Viscount Dillon
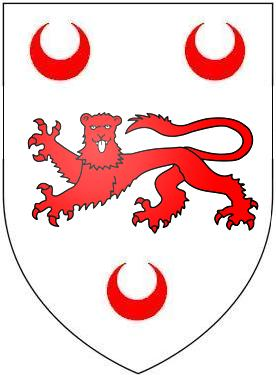
- Tenure: 1682–1691
- Predecessor: Lucas Dillon, 6th Viscount Dillon
- Successor: Henry Dillon, 8th Viscount Dillon
- Died: 12 July 1691; Battle of Aughrim
- Spouse: Mary Talbot
- Issue Detail: Robert, Henry, & Arthur
- Father: Robert Dillon of Loughglynn
- Mother: Rose Dillon

Theobald Dillon, 7th Viscount Dillon of Costello-Gallin (died 1691) supported King James II, was attainted on 11 May 1691, and fell in the Battle of Aughrim during the Williamite War. His attainder was reversed in favour of the 8th Viscount on 20 June 1694.

== Birth and origins ==
Theobald was probably born at Loughglynn, his parents' habitual residence. He was a son of Robert Dillon and his wife Rose Dillon. His father, Captain Robert Dillon of Loughglynn, was a member of the landed gentry. He was son and heir of Lucas Dillon of Loughglynn, who had been the second son of Theobald Dillon, 1st Viscount Dillon. At the time of Theobald's birth, the Dillons of Loughglynn were a cadet branch of the Viscounts Dillon. Theobald's mother was a daughter of John Dillon of Streamstown.

Theobald appears as the elder of two brothers:

1. Theobald (died 1691)
2. Lucas, died unmarried

His sisters were:

1. Alice or Elizabeth, married James Ferrall
2. Jane, married Lally
3. Mary, married a Dillon of Sinogweny

Family tree

Theobald Dillon with wife, parents, and other selected relatives. (Note: This family tree is partly derived from the Dillon family tree pictured in La Tour du Pin (1913). Also see the lists of siblings and children in the text.)

Theobald; 1st Viscount d. 1624	Eleanor; Tuite d. 1638
Christopher; Dillon of Ballylaghan d. 1624 d.v.p.*	Lucas; Dillon of Loughglynn; 1579–1656	Jane; Moore
Lucas; 2nd Viscount; 1610–1629	Thomas; 4th Viscount; 1615–1673	Theobald; Dillon	Robert D. of Loughglynn	Rose Dillon of Streamstown d. 1681
Theobald; 3rd Viscount; 1629–1630	Thomas; 5th Viscount d. 1674	Lucas; 6th Viscount d. 1682	Theobald; 7th Viscount d. 1691; Jacobite	Mary; Talbot d. 1691
Henry; 8th Viscount d. 1714	Frances; Hamilton d. 1751	Arthur; 1670–1733; French; General	Christina; Sheldon; 1684–1757
Richard; 9th Viscount; 1688–1737	Charles; 10th Viscount; 1701–1741	Henry; 11th Viscount; 1705–1787	Charlotte; Lee d. 1794

Legend

XXX	Subject of the article	XXX	Viscounts; Dillon

*d.v.p. = predeceased his father (decessit vita patris)

== Marriage and children ==
Theobald Dillon married Mary, daughter of Sir Henry Talbot of Templeogue, County Dublin, and of Mount Talbot in County Roscommon, a brother-in-law of Richard Talbot, 1st Earl of Tyrconnell. Theobald and Mary mainly lived at Kilmore, County Roscommon.

Theobald and Mary had six sons:

1. Robert, predeceased his father and died unmarried
2. Henry (died 1714), became the 8th Viscount Dillon
3. Arthur (1670–1733), became a general in French service
4. Christopher, captain in the Dillon regiment, died unmarried
5. James, in the Dillon regiment, died unmarried
6. Lucas, in the Dillon regiment, died unmarried

—and two daughters:

1. Jane, married Sir John Burke, Baronet of Mitford
2. Bridget

== Later life ==
In the 1680s Dillon was lieutenant-colonel in Clanricarde's Regiment of Guards of the Irish Army.

In 1683 Lucas Dillon, 6th Viscount Dillon, died childless at Kilfaughny, County Westmeath, despite having married twice. He was the last of the senior branch descended from Christopher Dillon of Ballylaghan. Theobald, his second cousin, was the next heir male of the 1st Viscount. Theobald inherited the title and the estate, becoming the 7th Viscount Dillon.

In 1688 Lord Dillon, as he now was, raised two regiments of foot for James II, one commanded by his eldest son, Henry Dillon, the other by his second son, Arthur Dillon. Both fought in the Williamite war in Ireland, but the second, Arthur Dillon's was sent to France with the Irish Brigade in April 1690 in exchange against the Lauzon's French Expeditionary Force.

Lord Dillon was a Roman Catholic member in the Irish House of Lords of the Patriot Parliament of 1689. On 11 May 1691 he was attainted.

== Death, succession, and timeline ==
Lord Dillon fell at the Battle of Aughrim on 12 July 1691. His widow was killed accidentally by the explosion of a bomb during the Siege of Limerick on 7 September 1691. As he had been attainted, his title and his lands were forfeit. However, in 1694 his son Henry managed to obtain a reversal of the attainder and succeeded to title and lands.

Timeline
The accuracy of the given ages depends on that of his birth (estimated) and those of the dated events.
Age	Date	Event
0	1650, estimate	Born, probably at his parents' house at Loughglynn, County Roscommon. (Note: His year of birth is constrained by the birth of his son Arthur in 1670.)
19–20	1670	His third son Arthur was born.
22–23	1673	His distant cousin Thomas Dillon, the 4th Viscount, died and was succeeded by his son, also called Thomas Dillon.
23–24	1674	His 2nd cousin Thomas Dillon, the 5th Viscount, died and was succeeded by Lucas Dillon, another of his 2nd cousins.
31–32	1682	He succeeded as the 7th Viscount at the death of his 2nd cousin Lucas Dillon, 6th Viscount.
34–35	1685, 6 Feb	Accession of King James II, succeeding King Charles II
37–38	1688	Raised Dillon's Regiment for James II.
38–39	1689, 13 Feb	Accession of William and Mary, succeeding King James II
40–41	1691, 11 May	Attainted by the Williamites.
40–41	1691, 12 Jul	Killed in action at the Battle of Aughrim.

== Notes and references ==
=== Sources ===
- Boulger, Demetrius Charles (1911). The Battle of the Boyne. London: Martin Secker. OCLC 1041056932.
- Burke, Bernard; Burke, Ashworth Peter (1915). A Genealogical and Heraldic History of the Peerage and Baronetage, the Privy Council, Knightage and Companionage (77th ed.). London: Harrison. OCLC 1155471554.
- Cokayne, George Edward (1916). Gibbs, Vicary (ed.). The complete peerage of England, Scotland, Ireland, Great Britain and the United Kingdom, extant, extinct, or dormant. Vol. IV (2nd ed.). London: St Catherine Press. OCLC 228661424. – Dacre to Dysart (for Dillon)
- D'Alton, John (1855). Illustrations, historical and genealogical, of King James's Irish army list, 1689. Dublin: Published by the author. OCLC 838655763.
- Fryde, E. B.; Greenway, D. E.; Porter, S.; Roy, I., eds. (1986). Handbook of British Chronology. Royal Historical Society Guides and Handbooks, No. 2 (3rd ed.). London: Offices of the Royal Historical Society. ISBN 0-86193-106-8. – (for timeline)
- La Tour du Pin, Henriette-Lucy, Marquise de (1913). Journal d'une femme de cinquante ans [Diary of a Woman in her Fifties] (in French). Vol. I (7th ed.). Paris: Librairie Chapelot. OCLC 1047408815.
- Lodge, John (1789). Archdall, Mervyn (ed.). The Peerage of Ireland or, A Genealogical History of the Present Nobility of that Kingdom. Vol. IV. Dublin: James Moore. OCLC 264906028. – Viscounts (for Dillon)

Peerage of Ireland
Preceded by Lucas Dillon	Viscount Dillon; 1682–1691	Succeeded by Henry Dillon
