= Custos Rotulorum of Westmeath =

Civil officer in County Westmeath, UK

The Custos Rotulorum of Westmeath was the highest civil officer in County Westmeath. The position was later combined with that of Lord Lieutenant of Westmeath.

== Incumbents ==
- 1662–?1672 Thomas Dillon, 4th Viscount Dillon
- 1728–1729 George Forbes, 3rd Earl of Granard
- 1765–1788 Thomas Nugent, 6th Earl of Westmeath
- 1788–1814 George Frederick Nugent, 7th Earl of Westmeath (died 1814)
- <1819–?1835 Thomas Pakenham, 2nd Earl of Longford (died 1835)
- –?1871 George Thomas John Nugent, 8th Earl of Westmeath (died 1871)

For later custodes rotulorum, see Lord Lieutenant of Westmeath
