= James Dillon (officer) =

Irish officer (c.1600–c.1669)

Sir James Dillon (c. 1600 – after 1669) was an officer in the armies of the Irish Confederate Catholic during the Irish Confederate Wars (1641–53) and an MP for County Westmeath in the Irish House of Commons. He was likely born at Kilfaughny, Athlone and lived in the vicinity.

== Birth and origins ==
James was probably born about 1600, at Kilfaughny, near Athlone, County Westmeath, youngest son of Theobald Dillon and his wife Eleanor Tuite. His father would become the first Viscount Dillon in 1622. His father's family was a branch of the widespread Old English family that descended from Sir Henry Dillon who came to Ireland with Prince John in 1185.

== Biography ==
Dillon was a captain in Wentworth's "New Army", which was recruited in Ireland to help put down a rebellion against King Charles I in Scotland. This force was disbanded after an outcry against arming Irish Catholics in the Parliaments of England and Scotland. When it disbanded in 1641, Dillon was authorised, with his own £1,000 (2009: £120,000), to raise a regiment of the demobbed soldiers for the Spanish Army. However, this plan came to nothing due to the outbreak of a Catholic rebellion in Ireland in October 1641. The brewing conflict lost him his investment and later that year he joined the revolt of his fellow Catholic gentry.

Dillon is alleged to have conspired with Connor Maguire, 2nd Baron of Enniskillen before the rebellion; he proposed seizing Dublin Castle but according to some accounts, the Earl of Ormonde, commander-in-chief, talked him out of it. However, the claim that Dillon and Ormonde (who was a Protestant) knew of the planned rebellion in advance has never been proved.

After the outbreak of the rebellion in 1641, Dillon joined the rebels and participated in the alternative government the Catholics set up at Kilkenny in March 1642, under the name, the Confederate Catholics of Ireland. He was appointed governor of Longford and Westmeath by the Confederate regime.

Dillon is recorded as a dove within the confederacy - favouring a speedy reconciliation with Charles I of England and Irish Catholic participation in the English Civil War on the royalist side. The question of whether to do this, or whether to achieve Catholic aims in Ireland by military force, against all the English factions, was a source of major division among the Confederates. Dillon was the dominant military leader in west Leinster and, as an infantry colonel, recruited and equipped over 1,000 men.

Throughout 1642, Roger Jones, 1st Viscount Ranelagh held him off in Athlone. Ranelagh held the castle, west of the Shannon. Ormonde, by this time commander of the English royalist forces in Ireland, relieved the town without difficulty. In January 1643, at Rathconnell near Mullingar, Dillon attacked a second relief force as it returned to Dublin with the remnants of Ranelagh's garrison.

His regiment assisted Thomas Preston, 1st Viscount Tara in capturing Roscommon and Jamestown.

In 1647 his regiment was destroyed, along with much of the Confederate's Leinster army, at the Battle of Dungan's Hill, when they were defeated by an English Parliamentarian army which by that time held Dublin.

Dillon fought against the Cromwellian conquest of Ireland from 1649 to 1651, when the English Parliament, victorious in the English Civil War, launched a renewed invasion of Ireland. In 1651 Dillon surrendered Athlone to the parliamentarians.

=== Family ===
- 8th (and youngest) son of Theobald Dillon, 1st Viscount Dillon and Elranor Tuite.
- His estate was 2,500 acres (10 km^{2}) in Mayo and Roscommon.
- Married Elizabeth (died pre 1653) (Father: Thomas Plunkett of Rathmore, Meath)

- Sons Ulick and James predeceased him.

- Married Mary (died pre-January 1665); widow of Major John Ridge.

- No issue

- His nephew Thomas Dillon, 4th Viscount Dillon inherited his estate

== Notes, citations, and sources ==
=== Sources ===
- Alger, John Goldworth (1888). "Dillon, Sir James (fl. 1667)". In Lee, Sidney (ed.). Dictionary of National Biography. Vol. 15. New York: MacMillan and Co. p. 83. OCLC 8544105.
- Murtagh, Harman (2004). "Dillon, Sir James". In Matthew, Colin; Harrison, Brian (eds.). Oxford Dictionary of National Biography. Vol. 16. New York: Oxford University Press. pp. 210–211. ISBN 0-19-861366-0.
- Webb, Alfred (1878). "Dillon, Theobald, Viscount". Compendium of Irish Biography. Dublin: M. H. Gill & Son. p. 149. OCLC 122693688.

- J. T. Gilbert, ed., A contemporary history of affairs in Ireland from 1641 to 1652, 3 vols. (1879-80)
- History of the Irish confederation and the war in Ireland... by Richard Bellings, ed. J. T. Gilbert, 7 vols. (1882-91) .
- P. Gouhier, Mercenaires irlandais au service de la France (1635-1664), The Irish Sword, 7 (1965–66), 58-75
- B O'Ferrall and D O'Connell, Commentarius Rinuccinianus de sedis apostolicae legatione ad foederatos Hiberniae Catholicos per annos 1645-1649, ed. J. Kavannagh, 6 vols., IMC (1932-49)
- CSP Ire., 1633-69
- John Lodge, The Peerage of Ireland, 4 (1754), 182-4
- A. Clarke, The Old English in Ireland, 1625-...
