= Henry Dillon, 11th Viscount Dillon =

Irish lord and French soldier (1704–1787)

Henry Dillon
- Viscount Dillon
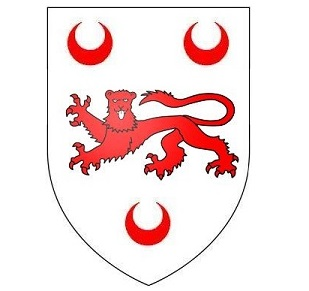
- Tenure: 1741–1787
- Predecessor: Charles, 10th Viscount Dillon
- Successor: Charles, 12th Viscount Dillon
- Born: 1705
- Died: 3 November 1787 (aged 81–82)
- Spouse: Charlotte Lee
- Issue Detail: Charles, Arthur, & others
- Father: Arthur Dillon, Count Dillon
- Mother: Christina Sheldon

Henry Dillon, 11th Viscount Dillon (1705–1787) was an Irish peer and a soldier in French service. He was the colonel proprietor of Dillon's Regiment, an Irish regiment of foot in French service, in 1741–1744 and again in 1747–1767. In the War of the Polish Succession (1733–1735), he fought at the sieges of Kehl and Philippsburg. In the War of the Austrian Succession (1740–1748), he was present at the Battle of Dettingen in 1743, on the French side, while King George II was present on the English side.

He then resigned from the colonelcy, left France and married the rich English heiress Charlotte Lee, daughter of George Lee, 2nd Earl of Lichfield, acquiring lands in Oxfordshire, England, in addition to his Irish lands. During his second term as colonel he was absent and the regiment was led by hired soldiers.

== Birth and origins ==
Family tree

Henry Dillon with wife, parents, and other selected relatives. (Note: This family tree is partly derived from the Dillon family tree pictured in La Tour du Pin. Also see the list of children in the text.)

Theobald; 7th Viscount d. 1691; Jacobite	Mary; Talbot d. 1691
Henry; 8th Viscount d. 1714	Arthur; 1670–1733; French; General	Christina; Sheldon; 1684–1757
Richard; 9th Viscount; 1688–1737	Charles; 10th Viscount; 1701–1741	Henry; 11th Viscount; 1705–1787	Charlotte; Lee d. 1794; Heiress
Charles; 12th Viscount; 1745–1813	Henrietta- Maria; Phipps; 1757–1782	Arthur; 1750–1794; French; General
Henry; Augustus; 13th Viscount; 1777–1832	Henrietta; Browne; 1789–1862

Legend

XXX	Subject of the article	XXX	Viscounts; Dillon

Henry was born in 1705, most likely at the Château de Saint-Germain-en-Laye, France, where the Jacobite court was. He was the second son of Arthur Dillon and his wife Christina Sheldon. His father, Arthur, had been born in 1670 in Ireland, a younger son of the 7th Viscount Dillon. Arthur had fought for the Jacobites in the Williamite War and had gone to France as the colonel of Dillon's Regiment with Mountcashel's Irish Brigade in April 1690 when Irish troops were sent to France in exchange for French troops sent to Ireland under Antoine Nompar de Caumont, duc de Lauzun. His father's family was Old English and descended from Sir Henry Dillon, who came to Ireland with Prince John in 1185.

Henry's mother was a daughter of Ralph Sheldon, an English Catholic and an equerry to James II. Dominic Sheldon, the Jacobite general, was her uncle. She served as maid of honour to Queen Mary of Modena, James II's second wife. Both parents were thus Jacobites and Catholics. Henry had four brothers and three sisters, who are listed in his father's article. His elder brother Charles played an important role in his life as he would precede him in the viscountcy and in the colonelcy.

== Early life ==
While a child, Henry lived with his mother at the court in exile of James Francis Edward (the old pretender) at the Château-Vieux de Saint-Germain-en-Laye. James II had died in 1701. King Louis XIV of France recognised James Francis Edward as the rightful king of England and Ireland (as James III) and of Scotland (as James VIII). Dillon's Regiment, led by Henry's father, fought for France in the War of the Spanish Succession (1701–1714). Louis XIV made Henry's father lieutenant-general in 1706 and comte de Dillon in 1711. However, in 1713 Louis XIV signed the Peace of Utrecht recognising the Hanoverian succession and ending its support for the Jacobites. James Francis Edward had to leave France and went to Lorraine, then to Avignon, a papal territory at the time, and finally to the Papal States in Italy. James Francis Edward's mother, the dowager queen, however, stayed behind at Saint-Germain-en-Laye.

In 1714 Henry's uncle the 8th Viscount Dillon died in Dublin, Ireland. (Note: Burke gives 13 January 1713, but Cokayne gives 13 January 1713/4 making it clear that Burke's date in an unadjusted Old Style date.) This uncle's father, Theobald Dillon, 7th Viscount Dillon, had been attainted as Jacobite in 1691 but had been pardoned and Henry, the 8th Viscount, had obtained the reversal of the attainder in 1693. He therefore had recovered his title and lands. The 8th viscount was succeeded by his son Richard as the 9th viscount.

In 1716 Henry, aged 11, was made an ensign to the colonel, his father, in the regiment.

The dowager queen, Mary of Modena, died at the Château de Saint-Germain in 1718. Henry and his parents were, however, allowed to stay in the castle. His mother lived in the castle until at least 1738.

In 1722 James Francis Edward, who now resided at the Palazzo del Re in Rome, created Henry's father Earl of Dillon.

In 1730 Henry's elder brother Charles took over as colonel of Dillon's Regiment as their father retired. Henry, aged 25, was promoted captain. In 1733 his father died at the Château de Saint-Germain-en-Laye. Charles, already colonel, now also succeeded in his father's titles, becoming the 2nd Count Dillon in France and the 2nd Earl of Dillon in the Jacobite peerage.

In the War of the Polish Succession (1733–1735), Dillon's Regiment was part of Louis XV's Rhine army, commanded until his sudden death by James FitzJames, 1st Duke of Berwick, an illegitimate son of James, Duke of York, later James II. Henry fought under his elder brother Charles at the sieges of Kehl (1733) and Philippsburg (1734) where Berwick was beheaded by a cannonball.

In 1737 Richard, the 9th Viscount, died in Ireland and Charles, already comte and earl, succeeded as the 10th viscount in the Irish peerage (see family tree).

== Viscount and colonel ==
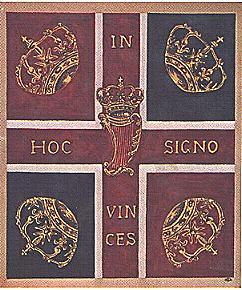
Colour of Dillon's Regiment, showing the Irish harp in the centre

On 24 October 1741 Henry's elder brother Charles, the 10th Viscount and colonel of Dillon's Regiment, died in London without surviving children. Charles was buried in St Pancras churchyard where Catholics were usually buried in London. Henry succeeded him in all his titles: 11th Viscount Dillon, Earl of Dillon in the Jacobite peerage, and comte de Dillon in France. He also became colonel proprietor of Dillon's regiment.

In the War of the Austrian Succession (1740–1748) France challenged the succession of Maria Theresa to the Habsburg monarchy. Lord Dillon, as he now was, participated in the Battle of Dettingen 27 June 1743. Being a peer of Ireland, Dillon resigned the colonelcy in favour of his younger brother James and left France in 1744 as England prepared a law to forbid its citizens to fight for foreign countries. His brother James succeeded him as colonel-proprietor of Dillon's Regiment.

== Marriage and children ==
On 26 October 1744 Dillon, aged 39, married Charlotte Lee, second daughter of George Lee, 2nd Earl of Lichfield in a Catholic ceremony at the chapel of the Portuguese Embassy in London. She was probably born late in 1724 and accordingly was 19 at the time. Her father had died in 1742 and her brother George Henry had succeeded as the 3rd earl. Charlotte was a great-granddaughter of Charles II and Barbara Villiers by her paternal grandmother Charlotte Fitzroy.

Henry and Charlotte had at least seven children:

1. Charles (1745–1813), succeeded him as the 12th Viscount Dillon
2. Frances (1747–1825), married Sir William Jerningham, 6th Baronet
3. Arthur (1750–1794), became colonel proprietor of Dillon's Regiment and was guillotined after the French Revolution
4. Catherine (1752–1797)
5. Laura (born 1754)
6. Charlotte (1755–1782), married Valentine Browne, 1st Earl of Kenmare (1754–1812)
7. Henry (1759–1837), became the last colonel of Dillon's Regiment and married Frances Trant

== Second term as colonel ==
Dillon's brother James commanded the regiment as colonel-proprietor from 1744 to 1745 when he was killed in the Battle of Fontenoy fighting under Maréchal de Saxe for France against the English under the Duke of Cumberland. Thereupon the fourth brother, Edward, succeeded as colonel. He continued to fight with the regiment under de Saxe against the English under Cumberland, but in 1747 he was wounded at the Battle of Lauffeld, taken prisoner, and died.

Dillon's brother Edward's unexpected death created a vacancy in the colonelcy of Dillon's Regiment that was hard to fill. The four brothers Charles, Henry, James, and Edward, had served one after the other as colonel, the fifth brother, Arthur Richard Dillon, was in holy orders. The only son born to Dillon, Charles, was 18 months old at the time and destined to be viscount, not colonel. Eventually, Louis XV allowed Dillon, to serve a second term as colonel, even if absent abroad. This second term lasted 20 years 1747–1767, during which the regiment fought in the Seven Years' War (1756–1763) under several hired commanders. During these twenty years another son was born and grew up. This was Arthur, born 3 September 1750. He became owner and colonel of Dillon's Regiment on 25 August 1767 at the age of 16. (Note: (Burke & Burke 1915) give the second term as 1744–1772.) He went to France and was sent to America to fight in the American Revolutionary War (1775–1783) against the English.

== Lichfield inheritance ==
Charlotte, Dillon's wife turned out to be a rich heiress. Her father, George Lee, 2nd Earl of Lichfield, had died in 1742, two years before her marriage. The 3rd earl, her only surviving brother George Lee, 3rd Earl of Lichfield married in 1745, but his marriage was childless. When he died in 1772, he was succeeded by their uncle Robert Lee, 4th Earl of Lichfield, whose marriage also was childless. When the uncle, the 4th Earl, died 4 November 1776, the earldom became extinct. Charlotte, the eldest surviving sister of the second earl, was the nearest relative and inherited the Lichfield estate. However, Henry and Charlotte never went to live at Ditchley House, which was probably inhabited by the last Earl's widow, Catharine, who survived until 1784.

== Death, succession, and timeline ==
Dillon died 15 September 1787 in Mansfield Street, London, and was buried at St. Pancras churchyard. He was succeeded by his eldest son, Charles, as the 12th Viscount.

Timeline
As only the year but neither the month nor the day of his birth is known, his age could be a year younger.
Age	Date	Event
0	1705	Born, probably at the Château de Saint-Germain-en-Laye.
7–8	1713, 11 Apr	The Peace of Utrecht ended the War of the Spanish Succession and France drops the Jacobites.
8–9	1714, 13 Jan	Uncle Henry, the 8th Viscount, died and was succeeded by his son Richard.
8–9	1715, 1 Sep	Death of Louis XIV; Regency until the majority of Louis XV
10–11	1716	Made an ensign to the colonel, his father, in Dillon's Regiment.
52–53	1723, 16 Feb	Majority of Louis XV
24–25	1730	Became captain, whereas Charles, the future 10th Viscount, became colonel
27–28	1733, 5 Feb	Father died at the Château de Saint-Germain-en-Laye.
31–32	1737	Richard, the 9th Viscount died and was succeeded by Henry's elder brother Charles.
35–36	1741, 24 Oct	Brother Charles, the 10th Viscount, died and he succeeded as the 11th Viscount.
37–38	1743, 27 Jun	Present at the Battle of Dettingen.
37–38	1744	Resigned the colonelcy in favour of his younger brother James and left France.
38–39	1744, 26 Oct	Married Charlotte Lee, daughter of the 2nd Earl of Lichfield.
39–40	1745, 11 May	Brother James fell at the Battle of Fontenoy.
41–42	1747, 2 Jul	Brother Edward mortally wounded at the Battle of Lauffeld.
42–43	1748, 18 Oct	The Treaty of Aix-la-Chapelle ended the War of the Austrian Succession.
51–52	1757	Mother died in Paris.
61–62	1767, 25 Aug	Son Arthur took over as colonel and owner of Dillon's Regiment.
70–71	1776, 4 Nov	Wife inherited when the last earl of Lichfield died.
81–82	1787, 15 Sep	Died in London.

== Notes and references ==
=== Sources ===
- Burke, Bernard (1866). A Genealogical History of the Dormant, Abeyant, Forfeited and Extinct Peerages of the British Empire (New ed.). London: Harrison. OCLC 11501348. (for Lichfield)
- Burke, Bernard; Burke, Ashworth Peter (1915). A Genealogical and Heraldic History of the Peerage and Baronetage, the Privy Council, Knightage and Companionage (77th ed.). London: Harrison. OCLC 1155471554. (for Dillon)
- Cokayne, George Edward (1893). Complete peerage of England, Scotland, Ireland, Great Britain and the United Kingdom, extant, extinct, or dormant. Vol. V (1st ed.). London: George Bell and Sons. OCLC 1180836840. – L to M (for Lichfield)
- Cokayne, George Edward (1916). Gibbs, Vicary (ed.). The complete peerage of England, Scotland, Ireland, Great Britain and the United Kingdom, extant, extinct, or dormant. Vol. IV (2nd ed.). London: St Catherine Press. OCLC 228661424. – Dacre to Dysart (for Dillon)
- Corp, Edward (2004). A Court in Exile: The Stuarts in France, 1689-1718. Cambridge: Cambridge University Press. ISBN 0-521-58462-0.
- Corp, Edward (2011). The Stuarts in Italy, 1719-1766: A Court in Permanent. Cambridge: Cambridge University Press. ISBN 978-0-521-51327-2. – (Preview)
- Dangeau, Philippe de Courcillon, marquis de (1859). Conches, Feuillet de (ed.). Journal du marquis de Dangeau [Diary of the Marquess of Dangeau] (in French). Vol. Tome Dix-septième. Paris: Firmin Didot Frères. OCLC 310446765. – 1717 to 1719
- Debrett, John (1828a). Peerage of the United Kingdom of Great Britain and Ireland. Vol. I (17th ed.). London: F. C. and J. Rivington. OCLC 54499602. – England (for the Dowager Queen and Jerningham)
- Debrett, John (1828b). Peerage of the United Kingdom of Great Britain and Ireland. Vol. II (17th ed.). London: F. C. and J. Rivington. OCLC 54499602. – Scotland and Ireland (for Dillon & Kenmare)
- Goubert, Pierre (1984). Initiation à l'histoire de la France [Initiation to the History of France] (in French). Paris: Fayard-Tallandier. ISBN 978-2-235-01484-7.
- Handley, Stuart (2004). "FitzJames, James (1650/51–1712)". In Matthew, Colin; Harrison, Brian (eds.). Oxford Dictionary of National Biography. Vol. 19. New York: Oxford University Press. pp. 881–884. ISBN 0-19-861369-5.
- La Tour du Pin, Henriette-Lucy, Marquise de (1913). Journal d'une femme de cinquante ans [Diary of a Woman in her Fifties] (in French). Vol. I (7th ed.). Paris: Librairie Chapelot. OCLC 1047408815.
- Lodge, John (1789). Archdall, Mervyn (ed.). The Peerage of Ireland or, A Genealogical History of the Present Nobility of that Kingdom. Vol. IV. Dublin: James Moore. OCLC 264906028. – Viscounts (for Dillon)
- MacLeod, John (1999). Dynasty: The Stuarts 1560–1807. London: Hodder & Stoughton. ISBN 0-340-70766-6.
- Miller, Peggy (1971). James: Old Pretender. Lanham MD: St. Martin's Press. ISBN 9780049230569.
- O'Callaghan, John Cornelius (1854). History of the Irish Brigades in the Service of France. New York: P. O'Shea Publisher. OCLC 1046538374.
- Palmer, Samuel (1870). St Pancras: Being Antiquarian Topographic and Biographic Memoranda. London: Samuel Palmer. OCLC 1040544139.
- Phillips, Walter Alison (1911). "Aix-la-Chapelle, Congresses of" . In Chisholm, Hugh (ed.). Encyclopædia Britannica. Vol. 1 (11th ed.). Cambridge University Press. pp. 449–450.
- Ruvigny, Melville Henry, Marquis de (1904). Jacobite Peerage Baronetage Knightage and Grants of Honour. Edinburgh: T C & E C Jack. OCLC 655825906.
- Webb, Alfred (1878). "Dillon, Theobald, Viscount". Compendium of Irish Biography. Dublin: M. H. Gill & Son. p. 149. OCLC 122693688.

Peerage of Ireland
Preceded by Charles Dillon	Viscount Dillon; 1741–1787	Succeeded by Charles Dillon
