= Theobald Dillon, 1st Viscount Dillon =

Irish viscount (died 1624)

Theobald Dillon
- Viscount Dillon
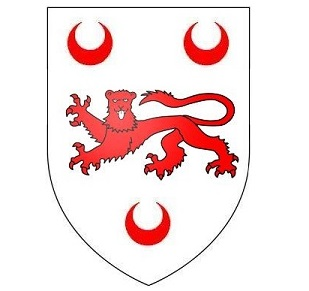
- Tenure: 1622–1624
- Successor: Lucas Dillon, 2nd Viscount Dillon
- Died: 15 March 1624; Kilfaughny, County Westmeath
- Spouse: Eleanor Tuite
- Issue Detail: James, Eleanor, Cecily, & others
- Father: Thomas Dillon of Ballynakill
- Mother: Margery Dillon of Kilmore

Theobald Dillon, 1st Viscount Dillon (died 1624), was an Irish military commander and adventurer. He held extensive lands in eastern Connacht and north-western Leinster, some acquired by sharp practices. He was a loyal supporter of Queen Elizabeth I of England in her Irish wars.

== Birth and origins ==
Theobald was probably born at Ballynakill, the habitual home of his father and grandfather. He was the third son of Thomas Dillon and his wife Margery Dillon of Kilmore, also called Mary. His father was the eldest son of his grandfather James Dillon, nicknamed the Prior, because he took care of several monastic properties at the dissolution of the monasteries. His father's side of the family descended from Lord Dillon of Drumraney, County Westmeath. Theobald's mother was a daughter of Christopher Dillon of Kilmore. His father's family like his mother's family were branches of the same widespread Old English family that descends from Sir Henry Dillon who came to Ireland with Prince John in 1185.

Theobald listed among his brothers
He appears among his brothers as the third son:
1. Gerald, married Cicely, daughter of a Dillon of High Baskin, County Westmeath
2. Edmund, lived in Ardnagrath Castle, County Westmeath
3. Theobald (died 1624)
4. Garret, a captain of an independent troop, ancestor of Garrett Dillon, Recorder of Dublin
5. James, from whom descend the Dillons of Ballynakill and some other Dillon cadet branches

List of Theobald's sisters
Theobald had three sisters:
1. Rose, married Thomas Dillon, son and successor to Gerald of Drumrany
2. Catherine, married Edmund Fitz-Edmund Dillon of Kilcomane
3. Bridget, married a Dalton of Moyvannane

Family tree

Theobald Dillon with wife, parents, and other selected relatives. (Note: Also see the lists of siblings and children in the text.)

Gerald; Dillon of Dunimoney	Ismay; Tuite
Robert; Dillon of Dunimoney	James; Dillon; The Prior	Catherine; Dalton	William; Dillon
Thomas; Dillon of Ballynakill	Margery; Dillon of Kilmore
Gerald; Dillon	Edmund; Dillon of Ardnegragh	Theobald; 1st Viscount d. 1624	Eleanor; Tuite d. 1638	Garret; Dillon; Captain
Christopher; Dillon of Ballylaghan d. 1624 d.v.p.*	Jane; Dillon m. 1604	Lucas; Dillon; 1579–1656 of Loughglynn	Jane; Moore	James; Dillon c. 1600 – aft. 1669
Lucas; 2nd Viscount; 1610–1629	Thomas; 4th Viscount; 1615–1673	Theobald; Dillon	Robert D. of Loughglynn	Rose Dillon of Streamstown d. 1681
Theobald; 3rd Viscount; 1629–1630	Thomas; 5th Viscount d. 1674	Lucas; 6th Viscount d. 1682	Theobald; 7th Viscount d. 1691; Jacobite	Mary; Talbot d. 1691

Legend

XXX	Subject of the article	XXX	Viscounts; Dillon

*d.v.p. = predeceased his father (decessit vita patris)

In 1559 Theobald commanded an independent force.

== Marriage and children ==
Theobald Dillon married Eleanor Tuite. So far the sources agree. However, she is either the widow or the daughter of William Tuite according to sources.

Theobald and Eleanor had 19 children, eight sons: (Note: Burke (1949) mentions only Christopher and Lucas; Cokayne (1916) does not mention his children; Debrett states he had eight sons but does not give details. Lodge lists all eight sons in detail.)

1. Christopher (died 28 February 1624), the eldest, married the eldest daughter of James Dillon, 1st Earl of Roscommon and became the father of the 2nd Viscount and the 4th Viscount
2. Lucas (1579–1656), ancestor of the 7th and later viscounts
3. William, denominated of Tolchan
4. Thomas, denominated of Brackloon
5. Edward, became a Franciscan friar
6. George, also became a Franciscan friar
7. John, became an officer in the army and died unmarried
8. James (c. 1600 – in or after 1669), the 8th and youngest son, who became an army officer

—and 11 daughters:

1. Rose, died young
2. Margaret, married Robert Dillon of Cannestown, son of Thomas Dillon, who was a brother of Lucas Dillon, the judge
3. Anne, married John, Viscount Taaffe, and was the mother of Theobald Taaffe, 1st Earl of Carlingford
4. Katherine, married Sir Ulick Burke of Glinsk, 1st Baronet
5. Mary, married Gerald Pettyt of Mullingar in County Westmeath
6. Elizabeth, married Thomas Fitzgerald of Newcastle in County Longford
7. Jane, married Hugh O'Conor of Castlereagh
8. Eleanor (died 1629), became a nun with the Poor Clares
9. Cecily (c. 1603 – 1653), became the first Abbess of the Poor Clares in Ireland
10. Bridget, died unmarried
11. Barbara, died unmarried

== Later life ==
In 1582 in the context of the Composition of Connacht, a surrender and regrant action, Dillon was appointed collector-general of the composition money in Connacht and Thomond. During this period of the English reconquest in Connacht, Dillon was involved in some sharp practices with the local landholders. In particular, he persuaded the various Costello freeholders of the Barony of Costello in eastern County Mayo, to save expense and ensure the smooth legal transfer, to allow him to surrender their lands for them in one land-title in the Surrender and regrant process and had it regranted in his own name, becoming the legal landowner in the process. He never returned this title to the lands to the native owners, which would lead to rapparee actions by Dudley Costello (or Costellogh) against the Dillons in the 1660s.

He fought under the Earl of Essex in the Nine Years' War (1593–1603) and was knighted by him on 24 July 1599. (Note: Lodge give this year as 1559, which seems to be an error.) To put this into perspective it should be said that Theobald was already in his sixties and that Essex knighted a great many people and was mocked by saying "he never drew sword but to make knights".

On 19 July 1608, King James I gave him a patent confirming the possession of the manor and town of Kilfaughny in County Westmeath where he then lived and finally died.

On 16 March 1622, King Jame created him Viscount Dillon of Costello-Gallen, cementing his legal title. He became the first of a long succession of viscounts Dillon. The territorial designation "Costello-Gallen" refers to the baronies of Gallen and Costello in County Mayo.

Lord Dillon, as he now was, held the title of Lord President of Connaught from c. 1621 on, which he shared with Charles Wilmot, who held that same title from 1616 to 1644.

== Death, succession, and timeline ==
Lord Dillon died on 15 March 1624 in Kilfaughny in County Westmeath. It is said that he died "at so advanced an age, that at one time he had the satisfaction of seeing above an hundred of his descendants in his house of Killenfaghny". Christopher, his eldest son, died on 28 February about two weeks before his father and therefore never succeeded his father. On the first Viscount's death, the title, therefore, passed to his grandson Lucas, Christopher's eldest son.

Timeline
As his birth date is uncertain, so are all his ages.
Age	Date	Event
0	1530, estimate	Born. (Note: Theobald's year of birth is set at very roughly 1530 as he died in 1624 at a very advanced age, which is interpreted to mean that he was in his 90s.)
27–28	1558, 17 Nov	Accession of Queen Elizabeth I, succeeding Queen Mary I
28–29	1559	Commanded an independent force.
51–52	1582	Made collector-general of the composition money.
68–69	1599, 24 Jul	Knighted by Essex.
72–73	1603, 24 Mar	Accession of King James I, succeeding Queen Elizabeth I
77–78	1608, 19 Jul	James I gave him a patent for Kilfaughny house.
91–92	1622, 16 Mar	Created Viscount Dillon of Costello-Gallen.
93–94	1624, 28 Feb	Eldest son, Christopher, died.
93–94	1624, 15 Mar	Died at Kilfaughny and was succeeded by his grandson Lucas.

== Sources ==
- Burke, John (1832). A General and Heraldic Dictionary of the Peerage and Baronetage of the British Empire. Vol. I (4th ed.). London: Henry Colburn and Richard Bentley. OCLC 39018719. – Abdy to Hutchinson (for Dillon)
- Chambers, Mary Catherine Elizabeth (1882). The Life of Mary Ward (1585–1645). Vol. I. London: Burns and Oates. OCLC 781247424.
- Clarke, Frances (2004). "Dillon, Cecily (c. 1603 – 1653)". In Matthew, Colin; Harrison, Brian (eds.). Oxford Dictionary of National Biography. Vol. 16. New York: Oxford University Press. pp. 202–203. ISBN 0-19-861366-0.
- Cokayne, George Edward (1916). Gibbs, Vicary (ed.). The complete peerage of England, Scotland, Ireland, Great Britain and the United Kingdom, extant, extinct, or dormant. Vol. IV (2nd ed.). London: St Catherine Press. OCLC 228661424. – Dacre to Dysart (for Dillon)
- Debrett, John (1828). Peerage of the United Kingdom of Great Britain and Ireland. Vol. II (17th ed.). London: F. C. and J. Rivington. OCLC 54499602. – Scotland and Ireland
- Fryde, Edmund Boleslaw; Greenway, D. E.; Porter, S.; Roy, I., eds. (1986). Handbook of British Chronology. Royal Historical Society Guides and Handbooks, No. 2 (3rd ed.). London: Offices of the Royal Historical Society. ISBN 0-86193-106-8. – (for timeline)
- Hammer, Paul E. J. (2004). "Devereux, Robert, second earl of Essex (1565–1658)". In Matthew, Colin; Harrison, Brian (eds.). Oxford Dictionary of National Biography. Vol. 15. New York: Oxford University Press. pp. 945–960. ISBN 0-19-861365-2.
- Lodge, John (1789). Archdall, Mervyn (ed.). The Peerage of Ireland or, A Genealogical History of the Present Nobility of that Kingdom. Vol. IV. Dublin: James Moore. OCLC 264906028. – Viscounts (for Dillon)
- Murtagh, Harman (2004). "Dillon, Sir James". In Matthew, Colin; Harrison, Brian (eds.). Oxford Dictionary of National Biography. Vol. 16. New York: Oxford University Press. pp. 210–211. ISBN 0-19-861366-0.
- Pollard, Albert Frederick (1900). "Wilmot, Sir Charles, first Viscount of Athlone (d. 1633)". In Lee, Sidney (ed.). Dictionary of National Biography. Vol. LXII Williamson–Worden. New York: The Macmillan Company. pp. 59–61. OCLC 8544105.
- Simms, John Gerald (1976). "Chapter XVII: The Restoration 1660–85". In Moody, Theodore William; Martin, F. X.; Byrne, Francis John (eds.). A New History of Ireland. Vol. III. Oxford: Oxford University Press. pp. 478–544. ISBN 978-0-1982-0242-4.
- Webb, Alfred (1878). "Dillon, Theobald, Viscount". Compendium of Irish Biography. Dublin: M. H. Gill & Son. p. 149. OCLC 122693688.

Peerage of Ireland
New creation	Viscount Dillon; 1622–1624	Succeeded by Lucas Dillon
