= Viscount Dillon =

Title in the peerage of Ireland

Viscountcy Dillon
- Blazon: Arms: Quarterly: 1st and 4th, Argent a Lion passant between three Crescents Gules (Dillon); 2nd and 3rd, Argent a Fess between three Crescents Sable (Lee).; Crests: A Demi Lion Gules holding in its paws an Estoile Argent.; Supporters: On either side an Angel proper vested Argent winged and crined Or each holding in the exterior hand a Branch of Palm also proper and having a Riband over the shoulder of the second.
- Creation date: 16 March 1622
- Created by: King James VI and I
- Peerage: Peerage of Ireland
- First holder: Theobald Dillon, 1st Viscount Dillon
- Present holder: Henry Benedict Charles Dillon, 22nd Viscount Dillon
- Heir apparent: the Hon. Francis Charles Robert Dillon
- Status: Extant
- Motto: DUM SPIRO SPERO (While I breathe I hope)

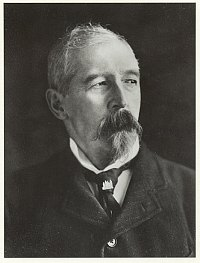
Harold Dillon, 17th Viscount Dillon.

Viscount Dillon, of Costello-Gallen in the County of Mayo, is a title in the Peerage of Ireland. It was created in 1622 for Theobald Dillon, Lord President of Connaught. The Dillons were a Hiberno-Norman landlord family from the 13th century in a part of County Westmeath called 'Dillon's Country'. His great-grandson, the seventh Viscount, was a supporter of the Catholic King James II of England and was outlawed after the Glorious Revolution. He founded 'Dillon's Regiment' of the Irish Brigade in the French Army, which was supported by the Wild Geese and achieved success at Fontenoy in 1745.

However, his son Henry, the eighth Viscount, managed to obtain a reversal of the outlawry in 1694 and later served as Lord Lieutenant of County Roscommon. His younger brother, Lieutenant-General Arthur Dillon, was given the French title of Count Dillon in 1711 and was also created "Viscount Dillon" and "Earl of Dillon" by James Francis Edward Stuart, the Jacobite claimant to the throne. His son Henry, the eleventh Viscount, was a Colonel in the French Army, but Dillon's Regiment was disbanded in 1793 due to the turmoils of the French Revolution. His son Charles, the twelfth Viscount, notably represented Westbury in Parliament and conformed to Anglicanism in 1767. His son Henry Augustus, the thirteenth Viscount, sat as a MP for Harwich and County Mayo. His great-grandson, the nineteenth Viscount, was a Brigadier in the Army. As of 2014 the title is held by the latter's great-grandson, the twenty-second Viscount, who succeeded his father in 1982.

== Viscounts Dillon (1622) ==
- Theobald Dillon, 1st Viscount Dillon (died 1624)
- Lucas Dillon, 2nd Viscount Dillon (1610–1629)
- Theobald Dillon, 3rd Viscount Dillon (1629–1630)
- Thomas Dillon, 4th Viscount Dillon (1615–1672)
- Thomas Dillon, 5th Viscount Dillon (died 1674)
- Lucas Dillon, 6th Viscount Dillon (died 1682)
- Theobald Dillon, 7th Viscount Dillon (died 1691)
- Henry Dillon, 8th Viscount Dillon (died 1713)
- Richard Dillon, 9th Viscount Dillon (1688–1737)
- Charles Dillon, 10th Viscount Dillon (1701–1741)
- Henry Dillon, 11th Viscount Dillon (1705–1787)
- Charles Dillon, 12th Viscount Dillon (1745–1813)
- Henry Augustus Dillon, 13th Viscount Dillon (1777–1832)
- Charles Henry Dillon, 14th Viscount Dillon (1810–1865)
- Theobald Dominick Geoffrey Dillon, 15th Viscount Dillon (1811–1879)
- Arthur Edmund Denis Dillon, 16th Viscount Dillon (1812–1892)
- Harold Arthur Dillon, 17th Viscount Dillon (1844–1932)
- Arthur Henry Dillon, 18th Viscount Dillon (1875–1934)
- Eric FitzGerald Dillon, 19th Viscount Dillon (1881–1946)
- Michael Eric Dillon, 20th Viscount Dillon (1911–1979)
- Charles Henry Robert Dillon, 21st Viscount Dillon (1945–1982)
- Henry Benedict Charles Dillon, 22nd Viscount Dillon (b. 1973)

The heir apparent is the present holder's son, Hon. Francis Charles Robert Dillon (b. 2013)

== See also ==
- Earl of Roscommon
- Baron Clonbrock
- Peerage of France
- Jacobite Peerage
