= Dillon's Regiment (France) =

Régiment de Dillon
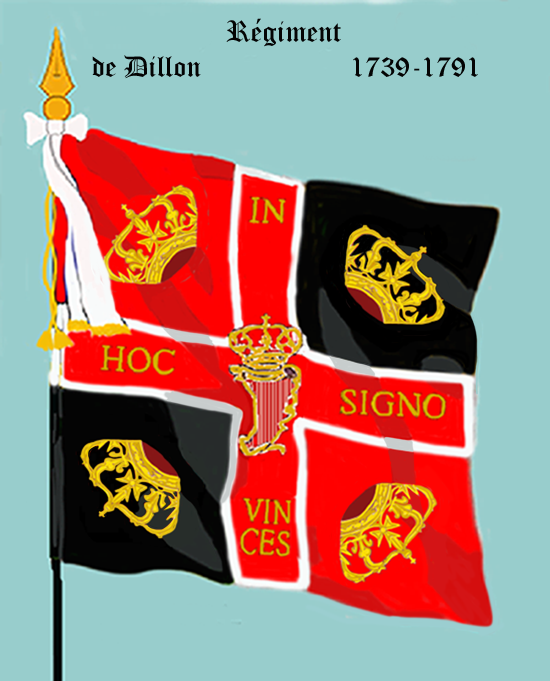
- Regimental flag of the regiment until 1791.
- Active: 1688–1793
- Country: Kingdom of France; Kingdom of France (1791–2); First French Republic
- Allegiance: King of France; French Nation
- Branch: (Kingdom of France) La Marine Royale (France) French Royal Army (France) French Army
- Type: Line Infantry
- Size: 2 Battalions
- Nickname: Dillon's Regiment
- Motto: In hoc signo vinces (In this sign you will conquer)
- Colors: red, black facing
- Engagements: Nine Years War; War of the Spanish Succession; War of the Austrian Succession; Anglo-French War/American Revolution; Naval Campaigns of the American Revolutionary Wars

Commanders
- Notable commanders: Theobald Dillon, 7th Viscount Dillon; Dillon Colonels of the Regiment in France (1) 1690-1728: Arthur Dillon, ’’Comte de Dillon’’ (2) 1728-1741: Charles, 10th Viscount (3) 1741-1743: Henry Dillon, 11th Viscount Dillon, (4) 1743-1745: James, killed at the Battle of Fontenoy (5) 1745-1747: Edward, killed at the Battle of Lauffeld hiatus 1747-1767 (6) 1767-1792: Arthur Dillon (1750–1794)

Dillon's Regiment (French: Régiment de Dillon) was first raised in Ireland in 1688 by Theobald, 7th Viscount Dillon, for the Jacobite side in the Williamite War. He was then killed at the Battle of Aughrim in 1691.

== Williamite War ==
Dillon's Regiment was first raised as part of the Irish Army in 1688 by Theobald, 7th Viscount Dillon who was killed at the Battle of Aughrim. During the Williamite War the regiment went to France in April 1690 as part of Lord Mountcashel's Irish Brigade, in exchange for some French regiments amounting to 6,000 troops. After the Treaty of Limerick in 1691, the regiment remained in the service of the kings of France under its present name. It was next commanded in France by Theobald's younger son, Colonel Arthur Dillon, until 1733.

== Jacobite rising of 1745 ==
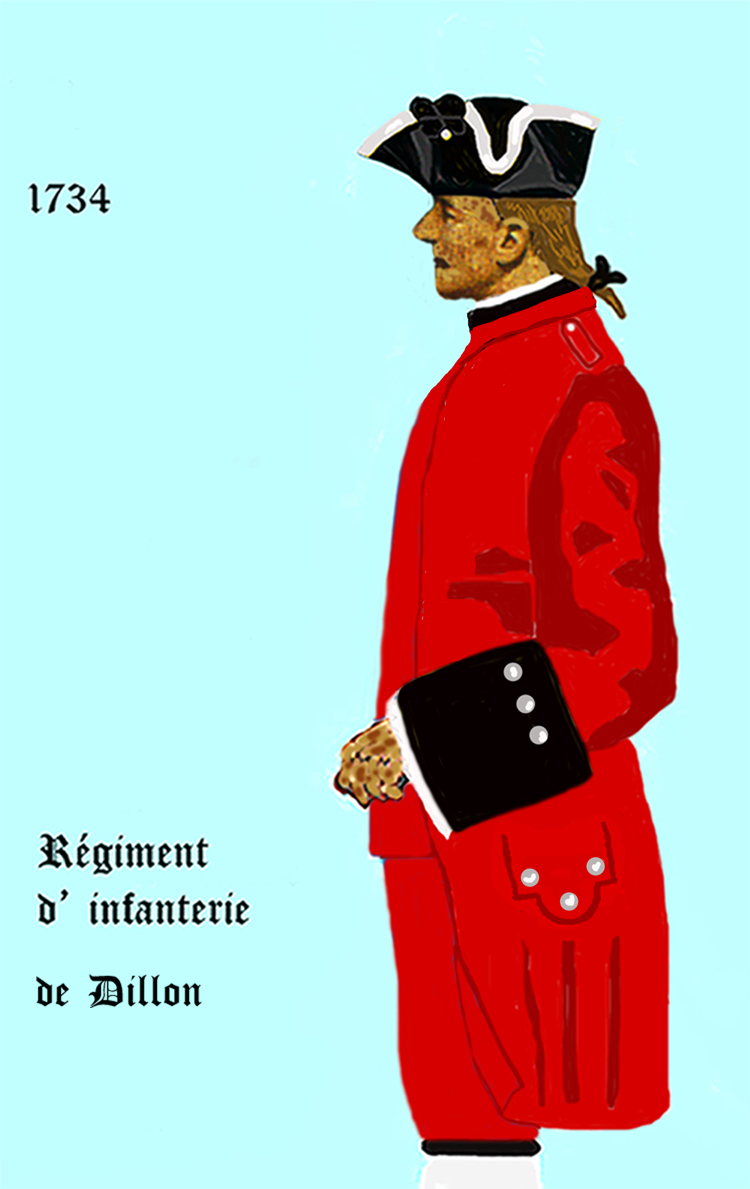
Uniform of the Dillon Regiment in 1734-1757

In November 1745, soldiers of Dillon's Regiment with other regiments of the Irish Brigade landed in Montrose, Scotland, in support of Prince Charles Edward Stuart and the Jacobite uprising. Edward Dillon, 4th son of Count Arthur Dillon, had taken over as commander of the regiment after his brother James was killed at the Battle of Fontenoy.

The regiment was present during several battles of the uprising, including the Jacobite victories at Falkirk and Inverness. Major Nicholas Glasgow of Dillon's Regiment commanded the Jacobite forces when the Hanoverians were defeated at the battle of Keith.

He was captured at Culloden with most of the Irish Brigade who weren't captured at sea. Colonel Walter Stapleton, overall Commander of the Irish Brigade, was mortally wounded at Culloden while the brigade was making a brave stand, saving many lives. After the uprising, Charles Radclyffe 5th Earl of Derwentwater, a Captain in Dillon's Regiment, was executed on December 8th, 1746 at Tower Hill, London.

== American War of Independence ==
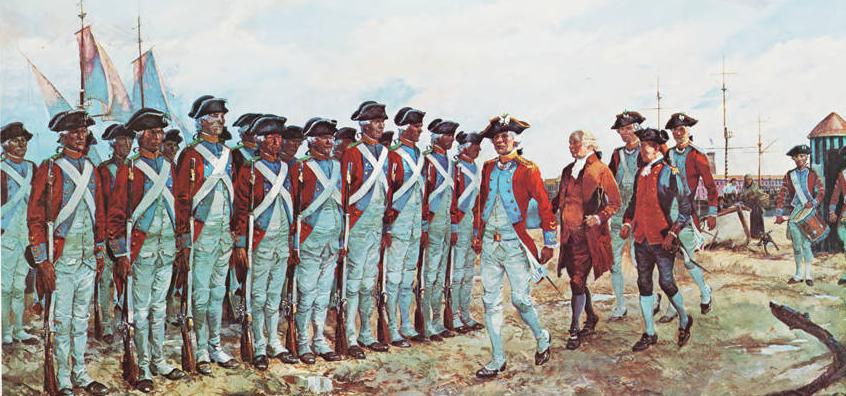
John Paul Jones' marines came from the Regiment of Walsh of the Irish Brigade of France.

In 1767 Arthur Dillon the great grandson of Theobald Dillon, 7th Viscount Dillon took command of the regiment. During the American Revolutionary War, the regiment participated in the Capture of Grenada, the Siege of Savannah, the Invasion of Tobago, and the Capture of Sint Eustatius. Detachments of the regiment were assigned to the French Fleet under Admiral François Joseph Paul de Grasse during the Battle of the Chesapeake. After the victory at Yorktown, the fleet sailed south and Dillon's Regiment participated in the Siege of Brimstone Hill. Brigadier General Arthur Dillon was made Military Governor of Saint Kitts after the victory at Brimstone Hill.

== Shadow formations ==
(Henry) Dillon's Regiment: Émigré elements of the French regiment passed into William Pitt's British Catholic Irish Brigade in 1794. These elements comprised the greater part of the officers who had emigrated from France, and new recruits raised on the Dillon lands in Ireland. Henry Dillon, a brother of Arthur Dillon was given command of the regiment. However, on campaign in Jamaica and Haiti, it had such losses, mainly due to the unhealthy climate, that it was disbanded in 1798. The flags and ensigns were returned to Charles, Lord Dillon, head of the Dillon family in Ireland.

(Edward) Dillon's Regiment: (Edward) Dillon's Regiment of Foot was raised in northern Italy in 1795, by Col. Edward Dillon, formerly of the Irish Brigade in France, to fight for the British in the Mediterranean.

== See also ==
- Arthur Dillon (1750-1794)
- Flight of the Wild Geese
- French Revolution Collection on Camille Desmoulins, Lucile Duplessis, and Arthur Dillon at Florida State University Libraries
