= Pierre Goubert =

French historian

Pierre Goubert (French: [pjɛʁ ɡubɛʁ]; 25 January 1915 – 16 January 2012) was a French historian. A member of the Annales School, he is considered one of the founders of historical demography and modern rural history. He was a noted specialist on the 17th century, especially of the Ancien Régime societies and mentalities.

== Works ==
- Beauvais et le Beauvaisis de 1600 à 1730 : contribution à l'histoire sociale de la France du XVIIe siècle (1958)
- Familles marchandes sous l'ancien régime : les Danse et les Motte, de Beauvais (1959)
- 1789, les Francais ont la parole : cahiers de doleances des Etats generaux (1964) with Michel Denis
- Louis XIV et vingt millions de Français (1966) in English Louis XIV and twenty million Frenchmen (1970)
- Cent mille provinciaux au XVIIe siècle (1968)
- Louis XIV: le roi, le royaume: dossier (1968)
- L'ancien régime 1. La société (1969) in English The ancien régime. French society, 1600-1750 (1973)
- L'avènement du Roi-Soleil (1971)
- L'ancien régime 2: Les pouvoirs (1973)
- Clio parmi les hommes (1976)
- La vie quotidienne des paysans français au XVIIe siècle (1982) in English The French peasantry in the seventeenth century (1986)
- Initiation à l'histoire de la France (1984) in English The course of French history (1988)
- Les Français et l'Ancien Régime. I - La Société et l'État (1984)
- Mazarin (1990)
- Un parcours d'historien : souvenirs, 1915-1995 (1996)
- Le siècle de Louis XIV: études (1996)
