= Demetrius Charles Boulger =

British author

- Boulger c. 1885
- Born: Demetrius Charles De Kavanagh Boulger; 14 July 1853; Kensington, London, England
- Died: 15 December 1928 (aged 75); Tooting, London
- Occupation: Author

Demetrius Charles De Kavanagh Boulger (14 July 1853 – 15 December 1928) was a British author who wrote several colonial histories and biographies. He wrote extensively on British relations with China, Russia, central Asia and India. He also wrote in favour of Leopold II and the Belgian Congo. He was a founder of the Asiatic Quarterly Review and a member of the Royal Asiatic Society.

== Biography ==
Boulger was born in Kensington to Brian Austin Boulger and Catherine de Kavanagh-Boulger. He was educated at the Kensington School. Beginning in 1876, Boulger contributed to the important British journals on questions concerning India, China, Egypt and Turkey and Congo. He promoted colonial Belgium and Leopold II's rule of Congo. With Sir Lepel Griffin he founded in 1885 the Asiatic Quarterly Review and edited it during the first four and one-half years of its publication.

He died in St George's Hospital.

== Works ==
- Life of Yakoob Beg; Athalik Ghazi, and Badaulet; Ameer of Kashgar. With map and appendix. 1878.
- Ought We to Hold Candahar?. 1879.
- England and Russia in Central Asia. With two maps and appendices. 1879.
- Central Asian Portraits; the Celebrities of the Khanates and the Neighboring States. 1880.
- History of China. London: W. H. Allen & co. 1881–84.
  - vol. I. W. H. Allen & co. 1881. hdl:2027/uc1.$b53835.
  - vol. II. W. H. Allen & co. 1882. hdl:2027/uc1.$b53836.
  - vol. III. W. H. Allen & co. 1884. hdl:2027/uc1.$b53837.
- Central Asian Questions. 1885.
- Lord William Bentinck. Rulers of India series. Oxford. 1892.
- A Short History of China. W H Allen & Company. 1893.
- Life of Gordon, Major-General, R. E., C. B.; Turkish Field-Marshal, Grand Cordon Medjidieh, and Pasha. 1896.
- The Congo State: Or, the Growth of Civilisation in Central Africa. Thacker. 1898. hdl:2027/uc1.$b58177.
- Life of Sir Stamford Raffles. 1899.
- China; with a supplementary chapter of recent events, by Mayo W. Hazeltine. 1900.
- India in the Nineteenth Century. H. Marshall & son. 1901.
- History of Belgium. 1902.
- Congo State is Not a Slave State : [a reply to Mr. E.D. Morel's pamphlet entitled "The Congo slave state"]. 1903.
- Belgian Life in Town and Country. Our European Neighbours. Putnam. 1904.
- Life of Sir Halliday Macartney, K. C. M. G., Commander of Li Hung Chang's Trained Force in the Taeping Rebellion, Founder of the first Chinese Arsenals, for Thirty Years Councillor and Secretary to the Chinese Legation in London. 1908.
- Battle of the Boyne, Together with an Account Based on French and other Unpublished Records of the War in Ireland (1688–1691) and of the Formation of the Irish Brigade in the Service of France; illustrated with many portraits. 1911.
- Belgium of the Belgians. 1911.
- Maharajah Devi Sinha and the Nashipur Raj, with 15 illustrations. 1912.
- England's Arch-enemy; a Collection of Essays Forming an Indictment of German Policy During the Last Sixteen Years. 1914.
- Holland of the Dutch. 1920.
- Reign of Leopold II, King of the Belgians and Founder of the Congo State, 1865–1909 (forming part III of the "History of Belgium") with twenty portraits. 1925.

== Bibliography ==
- Beale, S. (July 1886). "History of China by Demetrius Charles Boulger". The English Historical Review. 1 (3): 583–587. doi:10.1093/ehr/i.iii.583.
- Chatterjee, Rimi B. (2004). "'Every Line for India' : The Oxford University Press and the Rise and Fall of the Rulers of India Series". In Chakravorty, Swapan; Gupta, Abhijit (eds.). Print Areas: Book History in India. Orient Blackswan. pp. 65–102. ISBN 978-81-7824-082-4.
