= Gill (publisher) =

Irish book publisher

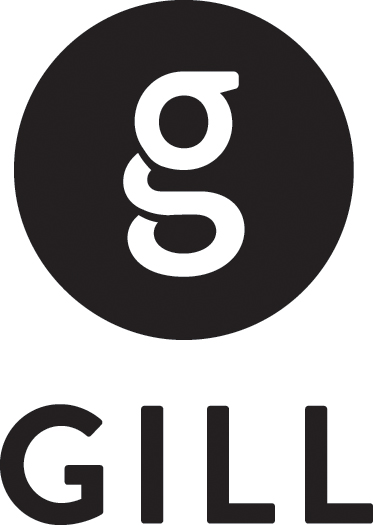
- Founded: 1856
- Founders: Michael Henry Gill, Co-Founder; James McGlashan, Co-Founder
- Country of origin: Ireland
- Headquarters location: Dublin
- Distribution: Gill Distribution (Ireland); Casemate IPM (US)
- Key people: Ruth Gill, Managing Director
- Publication types: Books
- Official website: www.gill.ie

Gill is an independent publisher and distributor based in Dublin, Ireland.

== History ==
In 1856, Michael Henry Gill, printer for Dublin University, purchased the publishing and bookselling business of James McGlashan, and the company was renamed McGlashan & Gill. In 1875, it was renamed M.H. Gill & Son. In 1968, the company became associated with the London based Macmillan Publishers (founded 1843) and Gill & Macmillan was established. In 2013, the Gill family bought out Macmillan.

== Divisions ==
Gill operates three distinct divisions:

- Gill Education – a school publisher.
- Gill Books – an Irish-interest trade publisher.
- Gill Distribution – a provider warehousing and distribution facilities to a range of domestic and international publishers.
