= Arthur Richard Dillon =

French archbishop (1721–1806)

The most reverend Arthur Richard Dillon
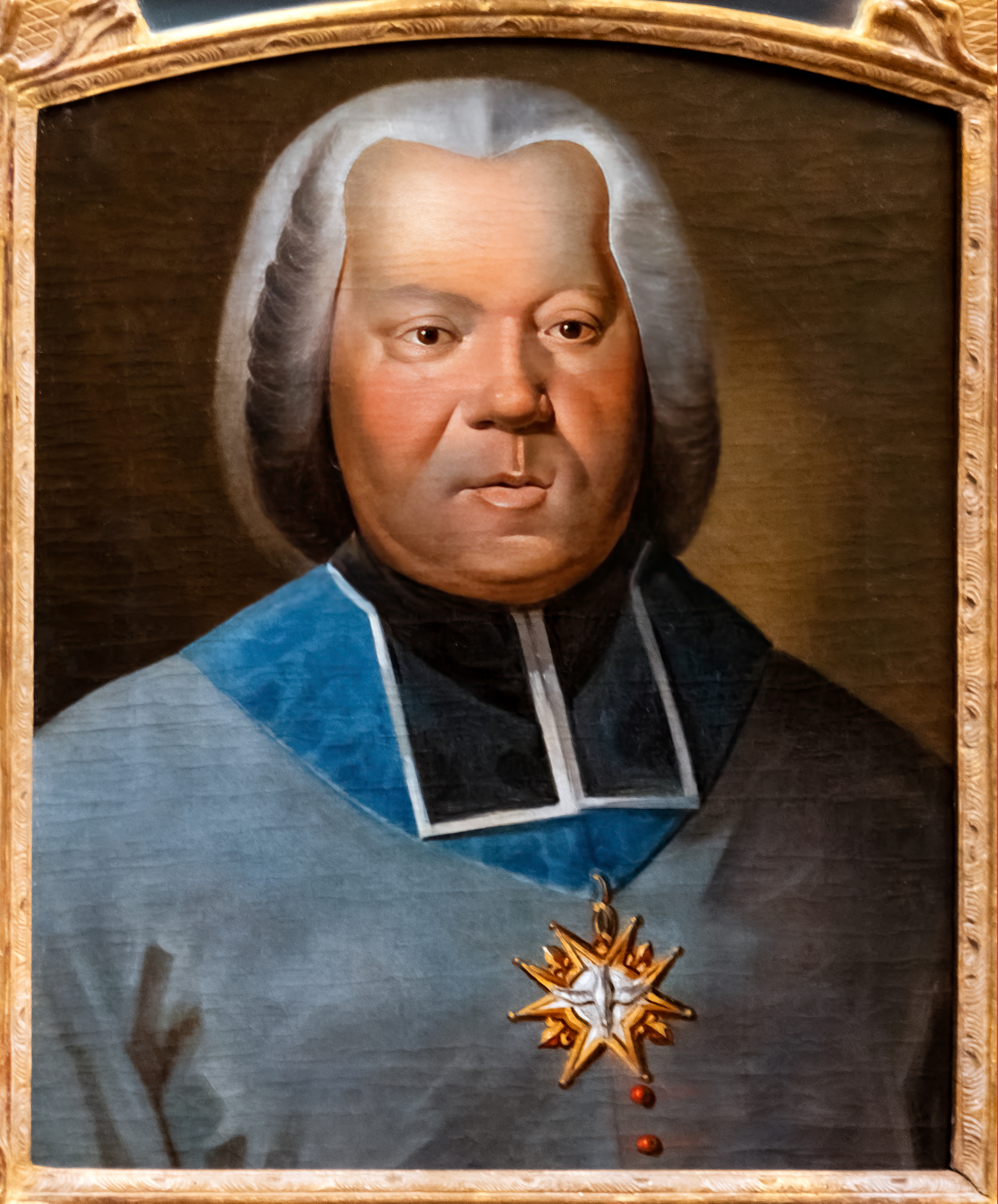
- Portrait of Arthur Richard Dillon wearing the Order of the Holy Spirit on its blue ribbon, the cordon bleu, around his neck

Archbishop of Narbonne
- In office 1763–1790
- Preceded by: Charles-Antoine de la Roche-Aimon
- Succeeded by: Guillaume Besaucèle

Personal details
- Born: 14 September 1721 Saint-Germain-en-Laye, Yvelines, France
- Died: 5 July 1806 (aged 84) London
- Parents: Arthur Dillon, Count Dillon (father); Christina Sheldon (mother)

Arthur Richard Dillon (1721–1806) was archbishop of Narbonne in France. He was the youngest son of Arthur Dillon, Count Dillon, who came to France with Mountcashel's Irish Brigade. At the French Revolution he refused the civil constitution of the clergy and fled first to Coblenz and then to London.

== Birth and origins ==
Arthur Richard was born on 15 September 1721 at the Château de Saint-Germain-en-Laye in France. He was the youngest of the five sons of Arthur Dillon and his wife Christina Sheldon. His father was born in 1670 in Ireland, had fought for the Jacobites in the Williamite War and had gone to France as the colonel of Dillon's Regiment with the Irish Brigade in April 1690 when Irish troops were sent to France in exchange for French troops sent to Ireland with Lauzun. He was a younger son of the 7th Viscount Dillon. His father's family was Old English Irish and descended from Sir Henry Dillon who came to Ireland with Prince John in 1185.

Henry's mother was a daughter of Ralph Sheldon, whereas Dominic Sheldon, the English Catholic Jacobite, was her uncle. She was a maid of honour to Queen Mary of Modena, wife of James II. Both parents were thus Jacobites and Catholics.

Arthur had four brothers and several sisters, who are listed in his father's article.

Family tree

Arthur Richard with parents, and other selected relatives. (Note: This family tree is partly derived from the Dillon family tree pictured in La Tour du Pin. Also see the lists of siblings in the text.)

Theobald; 7th Viscount d. 1691; Jacobite	Mary; Talbot d. 1691
Henry; 8th Viscount d. 1714	Arthur; 1670–1733; French; General	Christina; Sheldon; 1684–1757
Henry; 11th Viscount; 1705–1787	Lucius Cary; Viscount; Falkland; 1687–1730	Laura d. 1741	Arthur; Richard; 1721–1806; Archbishop
Edward; Rothe d. 1766	Lucy Cary d. 1804; Mme de Rothe
Charles; 12th Viscount; 1745–1813	Arthur; Dillon; 1750–1794	Therese; Lucy de Rothe; 1751–1782
Henry; Augustus; 13th Viscount; 1777–1832	Henriette -Lucy de la Tour du Pin; 1770–1853

Legend

XXX	Subject of the article	XXX	Viscounts of Dillon

Dillon's coat of arms. Above the escutcheon the green galero with fifteen tassels (as primate of Gallia narbonensis) and around the escutcheon is the cordon bleu of the Order of the Holy Spirit.

== Career ==
Arthur Richard entered the priesthood and was successively curé of Elan near Mézières, vicar-general of Pontoise (1747), Bishop of Evreux (1753), Archbishop of Toulouse (1758), and Archbishop of Narbonne (1763). In that latter capacity, he also was both the Primate of the ecclesiastical region of Gallia narbonensis and ex officio president of the estates of Languedoc.

He devoted himself less to the spiritual direction of his diocese than to the temporal welfare of its inhabitants, carrying out many works of public utility, bridges, canals, roads, harbours, etc.; he had chairs of chemistry and of physics created at the universities of Montpellier and Toulouse, and tried to reduce poverty, especially in Narbonne.

From about the age of fifty he lived with his wealthy, widowed niece, Madame de Rothe. She was born Lucy Cary and was the child of his sister Laura, who had married Lucius Cary, 6th Viscount Falkland. Madame de Rothe had been widowed in 1766. Dillon and Madame de Rothe were lovers, an arrangement considered scandalous even by the jaded standards of the day. They maintained a household primarily at the château de Hautefontaine, where Dillon kept an extravagant hunt. Madame de Rothe brought her daughter Thérèse-Lucy de Dillon, a favourite of Marie Antoinette, the French queen, and her granddaughter Henriette-Lucy, who would become the memoirist Henriette-Lucy, Marquise de La Tour du Pin Gouvernet.

In 1787 and in 1788 he was a member of the Assembly of Notables called together by Louis XVI, and in 1788 presided over the assembly of the clergy.

== Exile and death ==
Having refused to accept the civil constitution of the clergy, Dillon had to leave Narbonne in 1790. He was replaced by Guillaume Besaucèle, who was the constitutional bishop of Aude. Dillon then emigrated, accompanied by Madame de Rothe, to Coblenz in 1791. Soon afterwards both went to London, where he was visited in 1797 at his home in Thayer Street, Marylebone, by Henriette-Lucy, Marquise de La Tour du Pin Gouvernet.

On 15 July 1801, at Paris, Napoleon and Pope Pius VII signed the Concordat of 1801 and most of the French clergy that had gone into exile or hiding returned to take up again their normal duties. Dillon however disobeyed the pope and rejected the Concordat, probably because it suppressed his see at Narbonne, or because he wanted to avoid paying his debts in France.

On 7 February 1804, Madame de Rothe, his partner, died in London. He survived her by two years and died on 5 July 1806 in London. He was buried in St Pancras churchyard, which was the burial place favoured by the émigré community, as there was no official Catholic cemetery available.

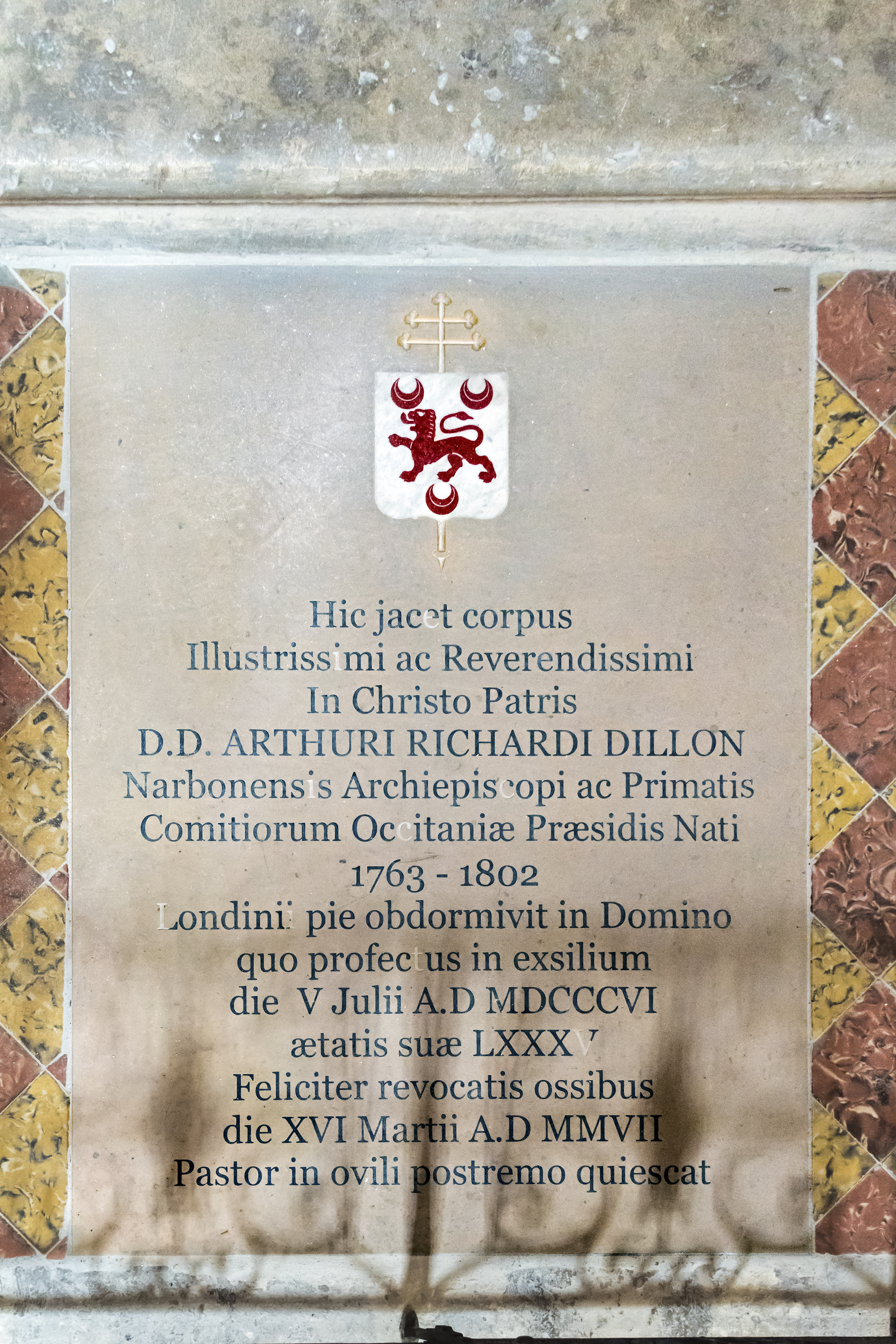
Burial of Arthur Richard Dillon in Narbonne Cathedral

Timeline
Age	Date	Event
0	1721, 15 Sep	Born, at the Château de Saint-Germain-en-Laye
11	1733, 5 Feb	Father died at the Château de Saint-Germain-en-Laye.
25–26	1747	Appointed Vicar-General of Pontoise
31–32	1753	Appointed Bishop of Evreux
35–36	1757	Mother died in Paris.
36–37	1758	Appointed Archbishop of Toulouse
41–42	1763	Appointed Archbishop of Narbonne
68–69	1790	Replaced by the constitutional bishop of Aude, Guillaume Besaucèle
69–70	1791	Fled to Coblenz and soon after to London
82	1804, 7 Feb	Partner, Madame de Rothe, died in London.
84	1806, 5 Jul	Died in London

== Final resting place ==
Dillon's grave on Old St. Pancras churchyard seems to have been disturbed in some ways during the cutting of the Midland Railway in 1865, as his name appears on the list of graves of important persons affected by that event on the Burdett-Coutts memorial, erected at that occasion. Between March 2002 and June 2003, part of the St Pancras Old Church graveyard was excavated in preparation for the London terminus of the Channel Tunnel Rail Link. During the archaeological investigation, Dillon's body was found to have been buried wearing a set of porcelain dentures. It is believed that he purchased them from a Parisian dentist named Nicholas de Chemant.

In March 2007 the body of Archbishop Dillon was returned to France and now lies in Narbonne Cathedral. On 19 May 2008, the porcelain dentures were accessioned into the Cobbe Museum (currently housed at Hatchlands, East Clandon).

== Notes and references ==
=== Sources ===
- Burke, Bernard; Burke, Ashworth Peter (1915). A Genealogical and Heraldic History of the Peerage and Baronetage, the Privy Council, Knightage and Companionage (77th ed.). London: Harrison. OCLC 1155471554.
- Chisholm, Hugh, ed. (1910). "Dillon, Arthur Richard" . Encyclopædia Britannica. Vol. 8 (11th ed.). Cambridge University Press. p. 273.
- Fisquet, Honoré Jean Pierre (1867). La France pontificale (Gallia christiana) Histoire chronologique et biographique des archevêques at évêques de tous les diocèses de France depuis l'établissement du christiansme jusqu'à nos jours: Metropole de Rouen: Evreux (in French). Paris: E. Repos. OCLC 496333101.
- La Tour du Pin, Henriette-Lucy, Marquise de (1913a). Journal d'une femme de cinquante ans [Diary of a Woman in her Fifties] (in French). Vol. I (7th ed.). Paris: Librairie Chapelot. OCLC 1047408815.
- La Tour du Pin, Henriette-Lucy, Marquise de (1913b). Journal d'une femme de cinquante ans [Diary of a Woman in her Fifties] (in French). Vol. II (7th ed.). Paris: Librairie Chapelot. OCLC 1047478749.
- Lavergne, Léonce Guilhaud de (1864). Les Assemblées provinciales sous Louis XVI. Paris: Michel Levy frères. OCLC 253663732.
- O'Callaghan, John Cornelius (1854). History of the Irish Brigades in the Service of France. New York: P. O'Shea Publisher. OCLC 1046538374.
- Sollier, J. F. (1913). "Dillon, Artur-Richard". In Herbermann, Charles George (ed.). Catholic Encyclopedia. Vol. IV. New York: The Encyclopedia Press. p. 797. OCLC 1157968788.
- Webb, Alfred (1878). "Dillon, Sir Henry". Compendium of Irish Biography. Dublin: M. H. Gill & Son. p. 149. OCLC 122693688.
