= Charles Dillon, 14th Viscount Dillon =

Irish viscount (1810–1865)

Charles Henry Dillon-Lee
- Viscount Dillon
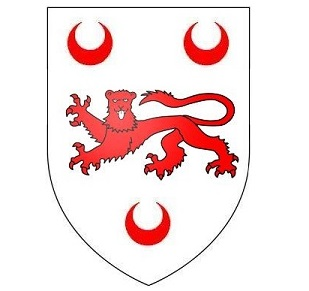
- Tenure: 1832–1865
- Predecessor: Henry, 13th Viscount Dillon
- Successor: Theobald Dominick Dillon-Lee
- Born: 20 April 1810; Ely Place, Dublin
- Died: 18 November 1865 (aged 55); Ditchley, Oxfordshire, England
- Buried: All Saints Church, Spelsbury
- Spouse: Lydia Sophia Story
- Issue Detail: Ethelred Florence & Geraldine Lee Frances
- Father: Henry, 13th Viscount Dillon
- Mother: Henrietta Browne

Charles Henry Dillon-Lee, 14th Viscount Dillon (1810–1865), was an Irish and English landowner. He lived in Ditchley, Oxfordshire, England, and was represented in Ireland by his agent Charles Strickland.

== Birth and origins ==
Charles was born on 20 April 1810 in Ely Place (a street near St Stephen's Green) in Dublin. He was the eldest son of Henry Augustus Dillon-Lee and his wife Henrietta Browne. His father was the 13th Viscount Dillon of Costello-Gallen. The Dillons were a widespread Old English family that had settled in Connacht and Leinster and descended from Sir Henry Dillon who had come to Ireland with Prince John in 1185. Charles's mother was the eldest daughter of Colonel Dominick Geoffrey Browne, MP for Mayo and sister of Lord Oranmore and Browne. His parents had married in 1807. He was one of ten siblings, who are listed in his father's article.

Family tree

Charles Henry Dillon-Lee with wife, parents, and other selected relatives. (Note: Also see the lists of siblings and children in the text.)

Henrietta- Maria; Phipps; 1757–1782	Charles; 12th Viscount; 1745–1813	Marie; Rogier d. 1833
Henry; Augustus; 13th Viscount; 1777–1832	Henrietta; Browne; 1789–1862
Charles; Henry; 14th Viscount; 1810–1865	Lydia; Sophia; Story	Theobald; Dominick; 15th Viscount; 1811–1879	Arthur; Edmund; Denis; 16th Viscount; 1812–1892
Ethelred; Florence	Geraldine; Lee	Harold; Arthur; 17th Viscount; 1844–1932	Conrad; Adderly; Dillon; 1845–1901
Arthur; Henry; 18th Viscount; 1875–1935	Eric; FitzGerald; 19th Viscount; 1881–1946	Nora; Beckett d. 1962

Legend

XXX	Subject of the article	XXX	Viscounts; Dillon

== Viscount ==
On 26 July 1832 Charles succeeded his father as the 14th Viscount Dillon. He inherited land in Ireland and in England. The Irish lands were the ancestral lands owned by the family since Theobald Dillon, 1st Viscount Dillon in the 17th century. They lay in north-eastern Connacht (counties Mayo and Roscommon) and in western Leinster (Westmeath). The land in England was in Oxfordshire and had been acquired more recently by the marriage of the 11th Viscount to Charlotte Lee, daughter of the 2nd Earl of Lichfield in 1744 and the inheritance that followed in 1776 at the death of the 4th Earl of Lichfield.

== Marriage and children ==
On 1 February 1833 Lord Dillon, as he was now, married Lydia Sophia Story, daughter of Philip Laycock Story and his wife Lydia Baring. She was a granddaughter of Sir Francis Baring, founder of the London merchant house of Barings. They married in Tusmore House, Oxfordshire, England, at that time the home of his father-in-law.

Charles and Lydia had two daughters:

1. Ethelred Florence (died 1910), never married
2. Geraldine Lee Frances (died 1920), married Captain Charles Augustus Drake Halford in 1859

== Slave compensation claim ==
Lord Dillon never owned slaves. However, he became involved in a claim under the Slave Compensation Act 1837 because he was one of a group of four people who were trying to recover a debt of £6,000 from Dominick Trant, owner of the Lower Windward Estate on the island of Montserrat in the British West Indies. When on 7 November 1836 Dominick Trant submitted the claim "Montserrat No. 15" for £1,977 (worth £203,461 in 2025) as a compensation for the loss he incurred by the emancipation of the 128 slaves of the estate, this group submitted a successful counterclaim. This group consisted of Lord Dillon, Philip Laycock Story, Henry Trant and James Flemming. The Dillons, Trants and Storys were related by marriage. Philip Laycock Story was not only Lord Dillon's father-in-law (by his daughter Lydia) but also Dominick Trant's father-in-law (by his daughter Caroline). Frances Trant was an aunt of Dominick Trant and a great-aunt of Lord Dillon by her marriage to General Henry Dillon, the last colonel of Dillon's regiment.

== Landlord and Irish famine ==
From 1845 to 1849 Ireland suffered the Great Famine. Lord Dillon's Irish estates lay in some of the worst affected areas. Despite living in England and being an absentee landlord in Ireland, he and his estate manager Charles Strickland, who lived at Loughglinn, seem to have been humane and seem to have helped the tenants rather than evicting them. A large stained-glass window in the baptistery of the Cathedral of the Annunciation in Ballaghaderreen, County Roscommon commemorates Lord Dillon for his fairness as a landlord during the great famine. This window was donated by his wife. Another stained-glass window in a chapel on the south side of the cathedral commemorates his agent Charles Strickland.

When Lord Dillon's Mayo tenants were discriminated against at the market of Bellaghy in County Sligo, his agent Charles Strickland built the town of Newtown Dillon in County Mayo next to the county border. The first houses were completed in 1846. The town soon took the name of Charlestown in honour of Charles Strickland.

== Death and succession ==
On 18 November 1865 Lord Dillon died aged 55 at Ditchley, the family's seat near Charlbury in Oxfordshire. The title passed to his younger brother Theobald Dominick, who became the 15th Viscount Dillon.

A monument to the memory of the 14th Viscount with full-length effigy in white marble was erected in the All Saints church (Church of England), Spelsbury, Oxfordshire. This work is signed by the sculptor Charles Francis Fuller, who worked in Florence.

== Notes and references ==
=== Sources ===
- Burke, Bernard; Burke, Ashworth Peter (1915). A Genealogical and Heraldic History of the Peerage and Baronetage, the Privy Council, Knightage and Companionage (77th ed.). London: Harrison. OCLC 1155471554.
- Cokayne, George Edward (1893). Complete peerage of England, Scotland, Ireland, Great Britain and the United Kingdom, extant, extinct, or dormant. Vol. V (1st ed.). London: George Bell and Sons. OCLC 1180836840. – L to M (for Lichfield)
- Cokayne, George Edward (1916). Gibbs, Vicary (ed.). The complete peerage of England, Scotland, Ireland, Great Britain and the United Kingdom, extant, extinct, or dormant. Vol. IV (2nd ed.). London: St Catherine Press. OCLC 228661424. – Dacre to Dysart
- Debrett, John (1838). Courthope, William (ed.). Debrett's Complete Peerage of the United Kingdom of Great Britain and Ireland (22nd ed.). London: F. C. and J. Rivington. OCLC 315551200.
- Galloway, Peter (1992). The Cathedrals of Ireland. Belfast: Institute of Irish Studies, Queens University, Belfast. ISBN 978-0-85389452-0.
- House of Commons (1838). Accounts of Slave Compensation Claims. Vol. 48. London: His/Her Majesty's Stationery Office.
- S. M. (1914). "The Trant Family (continued)". Kerry Archaeological Magazine. 3 (13): 20–38. doi:10.2307/30022075. JSTOR 30022075.
- Webb, Alfred (1878). "Dillon, Theobald, Viscount". Compendium of Irish Biography. Dublin: M. H. Gill & Son. p. 149. OCLC 122693688.

Honorary titles
Preceded by William Evetts	High Sheriff of Oxfordshire; 1857	Succeeded by Henry Lomax Gaskell
Peerage of Ireland
Preceded by Henry Dillon	Viscount Dillon; 1832–1865	Succeeded by Theobald Dillon
