= Fanny Dillon =

French noblewoman (1785–1836)

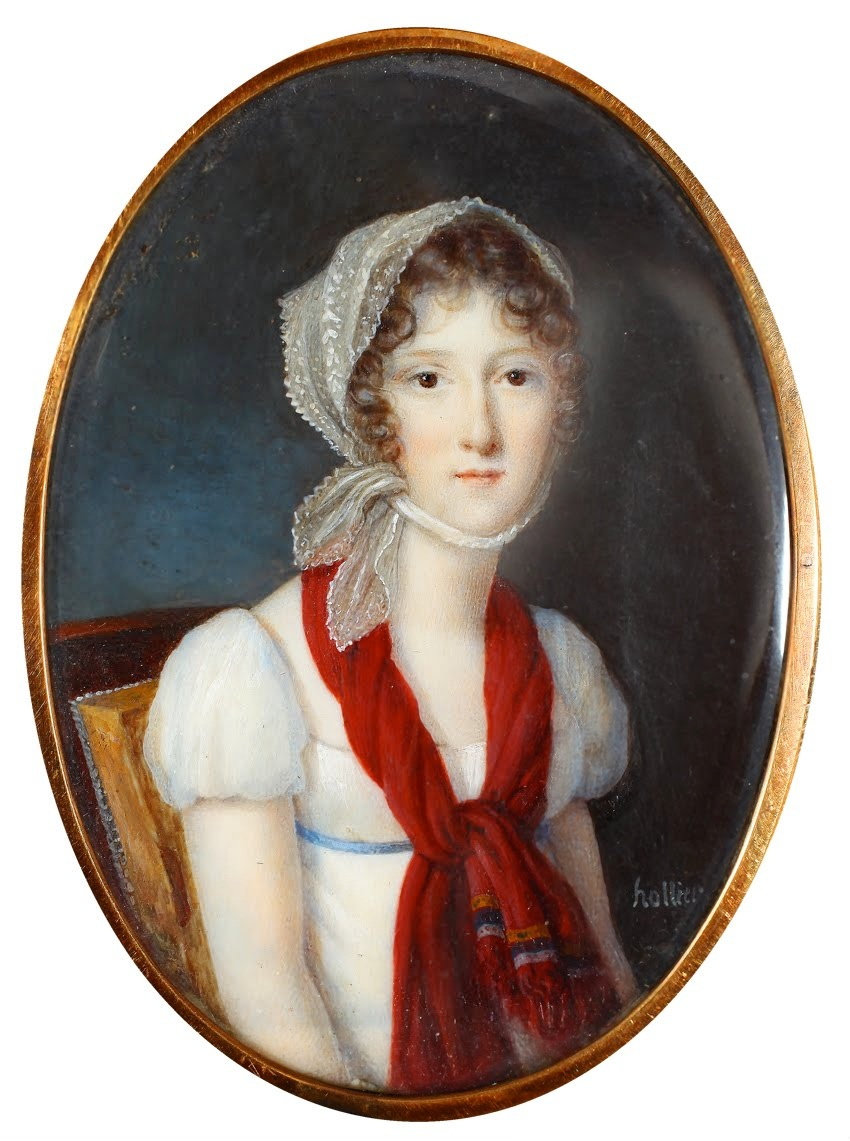

Élisabeth Françoise "Fanny" Dillon (25 July 1785 – 6 March 1836) was a French noblewoman and wife of Henri Gatien Bertrand.

== Birth and family ==
Born at two o'clock in the morning of 25 July 1785 at the château de Gontreuil on the Franco-Belgian border, Élisabeth Françoise was the daughter of the Irish French general Arthur Dillon, commander of the Régiment de Dillon, and the Martinique creole Laure de Girardin de Montgérald. Both her father and mother had been married before, while her mother had also, when still married to her previous husband, Alexandre-Francois Le Vassor de la Touche de Longpre (1744–1779), engaged in an affair with Alexandre de Beauharnais, from which resulted an illegitimate son. Laure was also a maternal cousin of de Beauharnais' wife, Rose Tascher de La Pagerie, who later became the Empress Joséphine, Laure and Rose's grandparents having been siblings.

Through her father, Fanny was a great-great-granddaughter of Charlotte FitzRoy, illegitimate daughter of Charles II of England.

Fanny's half-siblings, Elisabeth Alexandrine Le Vassor de La Touche de Longpré and Henriette-Lucy Dillon, married, respectively, Edward de Fitz-James, duc de Fitz-James and Frédéric-Séraphin de La Tour du Pin Gouvernet, comte de Gouvernet; while her younger sister, Louise Dillon, married the British naval officer Sir Richard Strachan.

== Revolution ==
Having served as Governor of Tobago and the representative of Martinique to the Estates-General, her father was guillotined in Paris as a royalist during The Terror in 1794 when Fanny was eight years old. During this time she had remained, after Dillon's departure for France, in Martinique with her mother, who now however determined, upon hearing of her husband's death, to emigrate to England, where the family moved in with Dillon's sister, Lady Frances Jenningham. Fanny then lived as part of the Jenningham household, moving between London and Norwich, until she and her mother returned to France in 1802, having been encouraged to do so by Josephine, the former wife of Laure's lover Alexandre de Beauharnais, now wife of the First Consul.

== Marriage ==
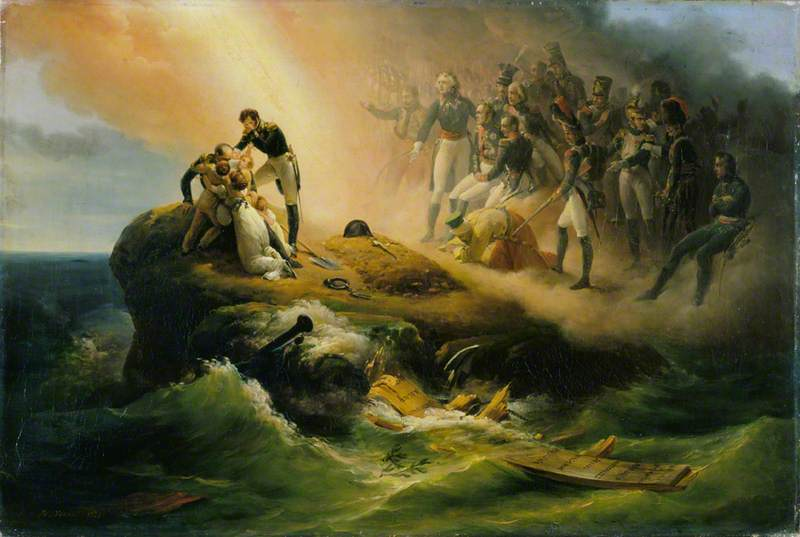
Napoleon's Tomb by Horace Vernet, 1821. Fanny and her husband are shown on the left

When introduced to the imperial court in 1805, general Henri Gatien Bertrand, the Emperor's aide-de-camp, soon became Fanny's chief suitor. Napoleon personally made known to her his aide's proposal of marriage, which Fanny nonetheless rebuffed, telling the emperor that it was her intention to marry Prince Alfonso Pignatelli d'Aragona. Pignatelli, however, fell ill with tuberculosis, and though he proposed marriage to Fanny on his deathbed, so that he might leave her his wealth, she declined, thinking that to accept would have been unjust to his family. Hearing of this, Napoleon resumed pressing her to marry Bertrand.

In August 1808 the emperor summoned Fanny to Fontainebleau and would no longer take no as an answer to the proposed match with Bertrand. Protesting, Fanny burst out: "What, sire, Bertrand! Bertrand! Why not the Pope's Monkey!" To which Napoleon said, "That will do, Fanny". When she requested a delay because her mother had just suffered the death of her daughter, the Duchess of FitzJames, and was in no fit state to organise a wedding, the emperor responded, "Have your sister come. She will arrange everything. I am leaving for Erfurt in a week. The marriage must take place before then." A letter from Maret was then indeed dispatched to Fanny's half-sister, the Marquise de la Tour du Pin, duly informing her of her task.

On 16 September 1808, the civil contract was signed in front of the emperor in St. Cloud, before a religious ceremony, conducted by the Bishop of Nancy, was celebrated in the chapel of Hortense de Beauharnais' château de St-Leu the next day; Talleyrand, Duroc, Berthier and Maret acting as witnesses to both. Despite Fanny's initial opposition, the marriage to Bertrand proved a happy one.

== Exile with Napoleon ==
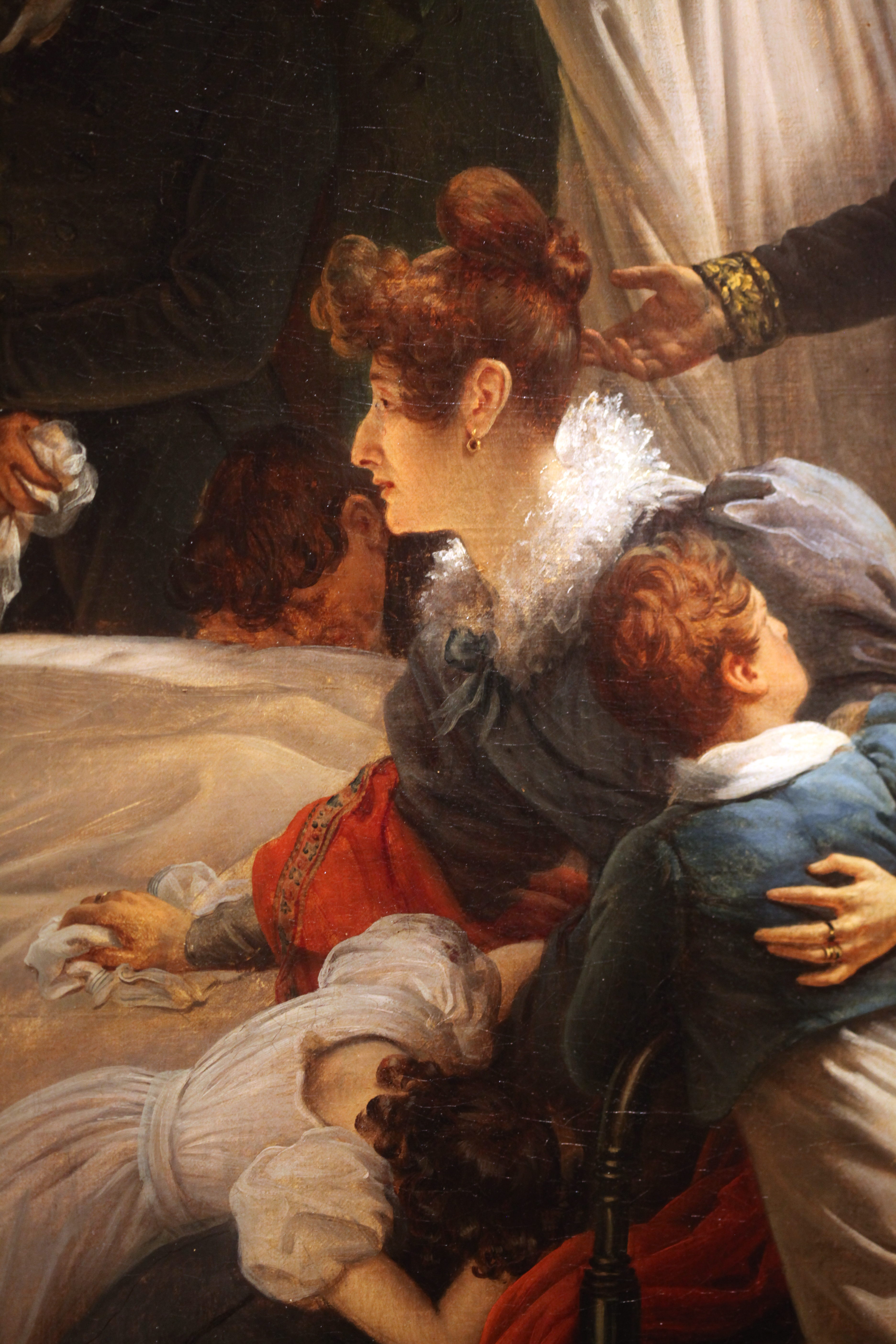
Detail of Charles de Steuben's portrait of Napoleon's death, showing Fanny with her children Hortense and Henri.

As Grand Marshal of the Palace since 1813, Bertrand chose to accompany his emperor into exile on Elba in 1814, where Fanny soon joined him. She later told Gourgaud that at this time she had been the one to inform Napoleon of Josephine's death. Following Waterloo, Fanny and her husband followed Napoleon aboard Bellerophon and to St Helena. She was present in the room at Longwood at Napoleon's death on 5 May 1821, after which she and her family returned to England.

== Death ==
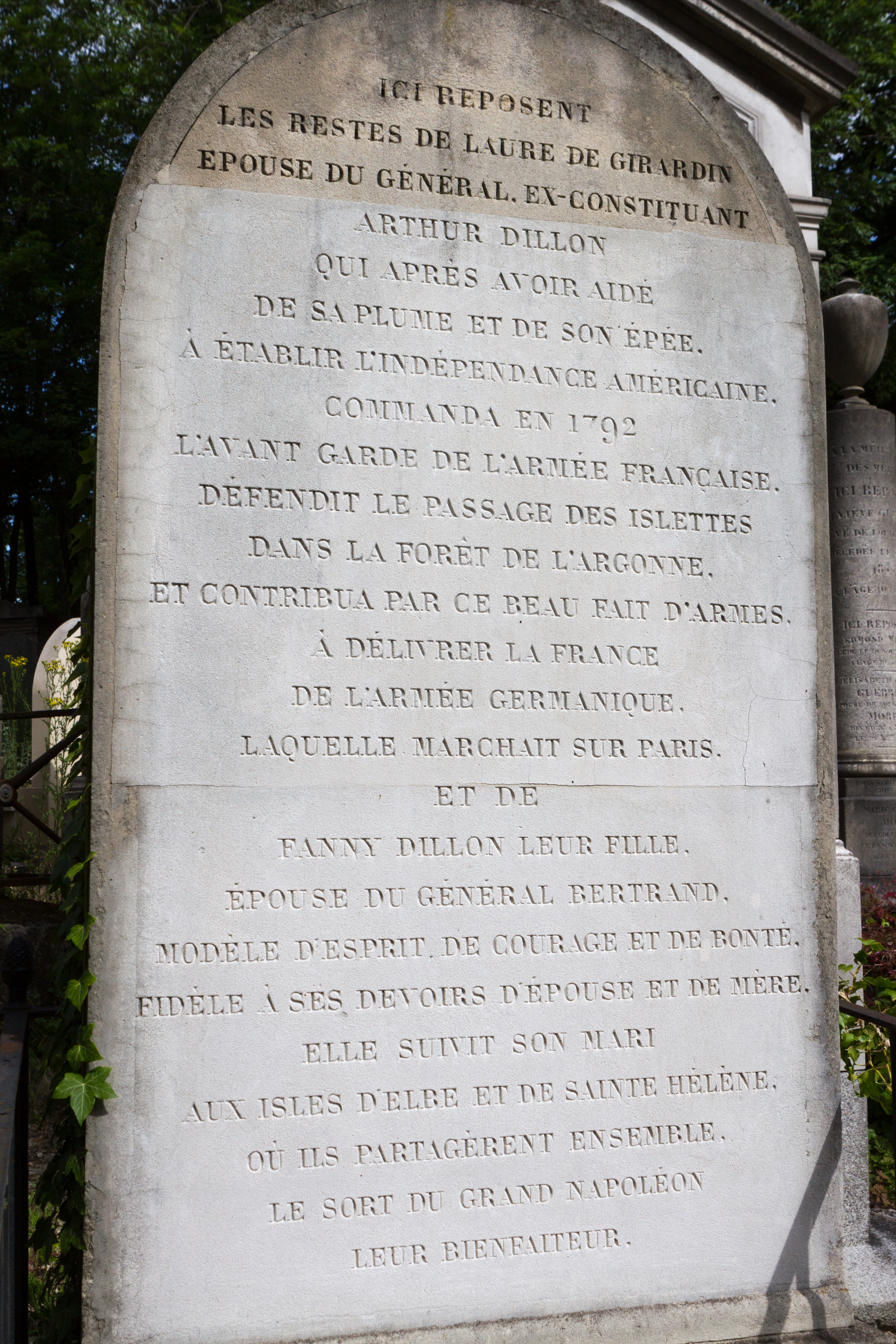
Tomb in Père-Lachaise, where Fanny is buried with her father.

She died aged fifty in her château de Laleuf, St-Maur, outside Châteauroux, in the evening of 6 March 1836.
