= Henry Dillon, 13th Viscount Dillon =

Irish writer (1777–1832)

The Right Honourable The Viscount Dillon
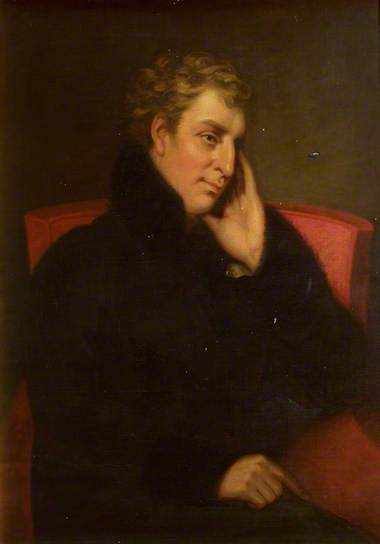
- Detail from the portrait below
- Tenure: 1813–1832
- Predecessor: Charles, 12th Viscount Dillon
- Successor: Charles, 14th Viscount Dillon
- Born: 28 October 1777; Brussels, Austrian Netherlands
- Died: 24 July 1832 (aged 54); London, England
- Spouse: Henrietta Browne (m. 1807)
- Issue Detail: Henrietta, Charles, Constantine, & others
- Father: Charles, 12th Viscount Dillon
- Mother: Henrietta Maria Phipps

Henry Augustus Dillon-Lee, 13th Viscount Dillon (1777–1832), was an Irish politician, soldier and writer. Despite being a Protestant, he supported Catholic emancipation in Ireland and wrote on the topic. He sat as MP for Harwich in England in the last parliament of Great Britain and the first parliament of the United Kingdom. In the second parliament of the United Kingdom he sat for County Mayo in Ireland. Through his daughter Henrietta, he was ancestor to Clementine Hozier (the wife of Winston Churchill) and to the Mitford sisters.

He was the colonel of a regiment and wrote on military subjects. He wrote fiction publishing two historical novels.

== Birth and origins ==
Family tree

Henry Augustus Dillon-Lee with wife, parents, and other selected relatives. (Note: This family tree is partly derived from the Dillon family tree pictured in La Tour du Pin. Also see the list of children in the text.)

Constantine; 1st Baron; Mulgrave; 1722–1775	Lepell; Hervey	Henry; 11th Viscount; 1705–1787
Henrietta- Maria; Phipps; 1757–1782	Charles; 12th Viscount; 1745–1813	Marie; Rogier d. 1833
Henry; Augustus; 13th Viscount; 1777–1832	Henrietta; Browne; 1789–1862
Charles; Henry; 14th Viscount; 1810–1865	Theobald; Dominick; 15th Viscount; 1811–1879	Arthur; Edmund; 16th Viscount; 1812–1892
Harold Arthur; 17th Viscount; 1844–1932	Conrad; Adderly; Dillon; 1845–1901

Charlotte; Lee d. 1794
Arthur; Dillon; 1750–1794
Ellen; Adderly; 1809–1896
Ellen; Louisa; Dashwood d. 1917

Legend

XXX	Subject of the article	XXX	Viscounts; Dillon

Henry Augustus was born on 28 October 1777 at Brussels, then the capital of the Austrian Netherlands. He was the eldest son of Charles Dillon-Lee and his first wife Henrietta Maria Phipps. His father was the 12th Viscount Dillon, who had in 1767 conformed to the established religion.

Henry Augustus's mother was the daughter of Constantine John Phipps, 1st Baron Mulgrave. Her family was Anglo-Irish. Thus both parents were Protestants and part of the Protestant Ascendancy in Ireland. They had married in 1776 at Brussels. Henry Augustus had one sister, Frances Charlotte.

== Early life ==
Henry Augustus's mother died in 1782 when he was four. In 1787 his father remarried to Marie Rogier of Mechelen, who was an actress in Brussels and had been his mistress before he married Henry's mother. Henry Augustus had three half-siblings, a brother and two sisters, who were born from his father's second marriage.

Henry Augustus was brought up by his uncle Constantine Phipps, 2nd Baron Mulgrave. In 1794, when Dillon-Lee (i.e. Henry Augustus) was 17, he was made the colonel of a regiment in the newly created Catholic Irish Brigade, an unlikely employment for a Protestant, that was due to his family's military connection to the Irish Brigade. This Catholic Irish Brigade lasted four years, being dissolved in 1798. On 21 October 1795 Dillon-Lee immatriculated at Christ Church, Oxford.

In 1799, aged 22, he contested and won a by-election caused by the death of Richard Hopkins MP for Harwich Borough, County Essex. This was during the 18th and last parliament of Great Britain, summoned in 1796 to meet at Westminster on 12 July 1796. It continued without a general election as the 1st Parliament of the United Kingdom, 1801–1802. He sat therefore until 29 June 1802 when parliament was dissolved.

In the general election of 1802 he was elected for one of the two seats for County Mayo in the House of Commons of the United Kingdom.

In 1805 he raised a new regiment in Ireland, called the Duke of York's Irish or the 101st Regiment of Foot. He owned the regiment and hired out its services to the British army under a letter of service.

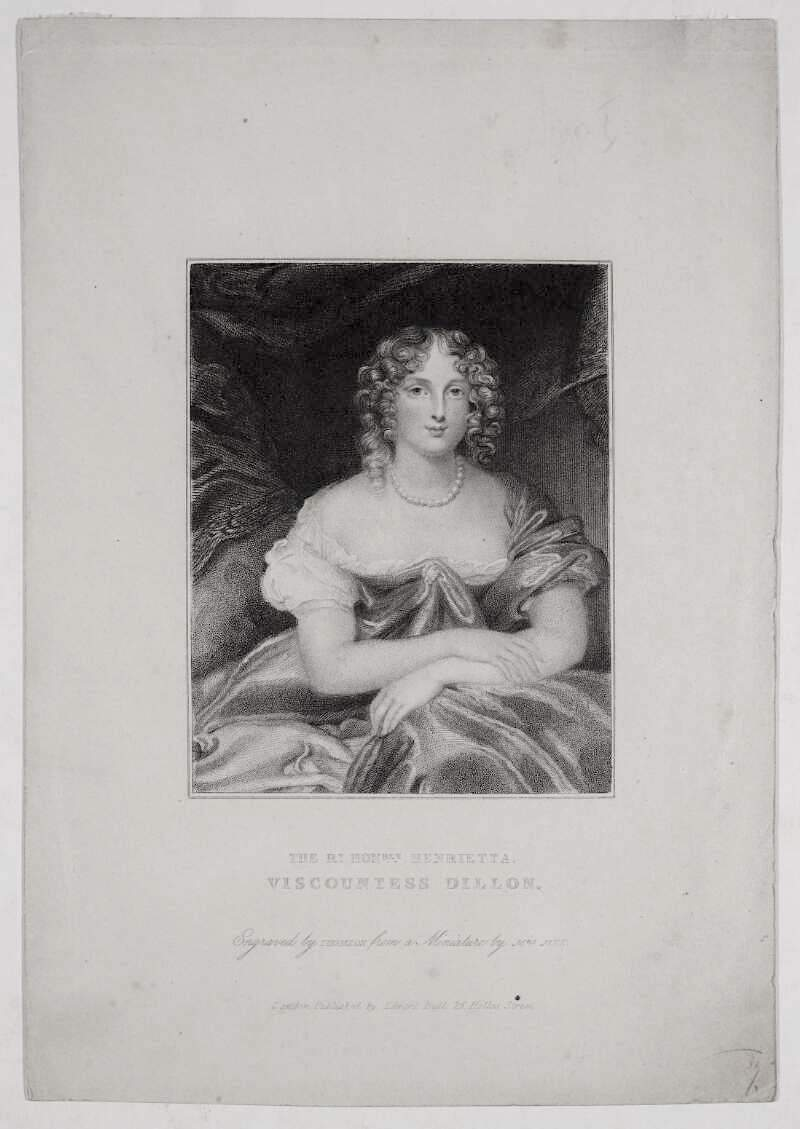
Henrietta Browne, Viscountess Dillon

== Marriage and children ==
In February 1807 at Castlemacgarrett, Dillon-Lee married Henrietta Browne, sister of Dominick, 1st Baron Oranmore and Browne, daughter of Dominick-Geoffrey Browne, by Margaret, daughter of George Browne, 4th son of the 1st Earl of Altamont. The marriage took place at Browne ancestral Castle MacGarrett near Claremorris, County Mayo, Ireland. The Brownes of Mayo were an Anglo-Irish, Protestant family. Henrietta's niece was married to George A. Lawrence, author of Guy Livingstone.

Henry Augustus and Henrietta had ten children:

1. Henrietta Maria (1807–1896), married Edward Stanley, 2nd Baron Stanley of Alderley, and campaigned for better education for girls (Note: Henrietta Stanley was born on 21 December 1807 in Halifax, Nova Scotia, Canada, but John Debrett (1828) wrongly says in 1808.)
2. Charles Henry (1810–1865), born in Dublin, died at Ditchley, Oxford; succeeded his father as 14th Viscount
3. Theobald Dominick (1811–1879), the 15th Viscount Dillon, who died childless and was succeeded by his brother
4. Arthur Edmund Denis (1812–1892), married Ellen Adderley and succeeded his brother as the 16th Viscount Dillon
5. Constantine (1813–1853), who emigrated to New Zealand
6. Robert George Lee (1817–1822), who died young
7. Margaret Frances Florence (1818–1885), who was a maid of honour to her majesty and married the geologist William Hamilton. They were the parents of Alexander Hamilton, 10th Lord Belhaven and Stenton, and the grandparents of William Goodenough and Robert Udny-Hamilton, 11th Lord Belhaven and Stenton.
8. Gerald Normanby (1823–1880), married Louisa FitzGibbon, daughter of Richard Hobart FitzGibbons, 3rd Earl of Clare, and changed his surname to hers
9. Louisa Anne Rose (1825–1902), married Spencer-Cecil Ponsonby of Bessborough. They were the parents of John Ponsonby-Fane.
10. Helena Matilda (born 1827)

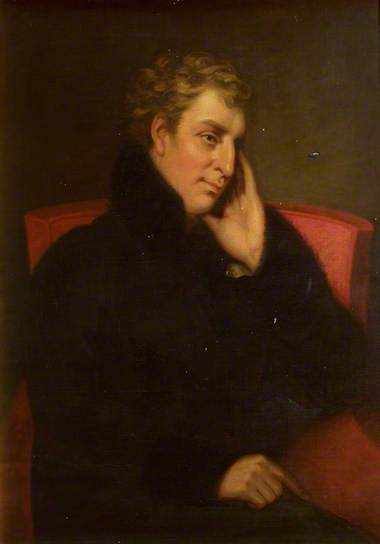
Henry Dillon-Lee, Viscount Dillon, by John Hoppner

== Later life, death, and timeline ==
Dillon-Lee's regiment was ordered to Halifax, Nova Scotia, Canada, to where he also took his wife and where his eldest child was born in 1807.

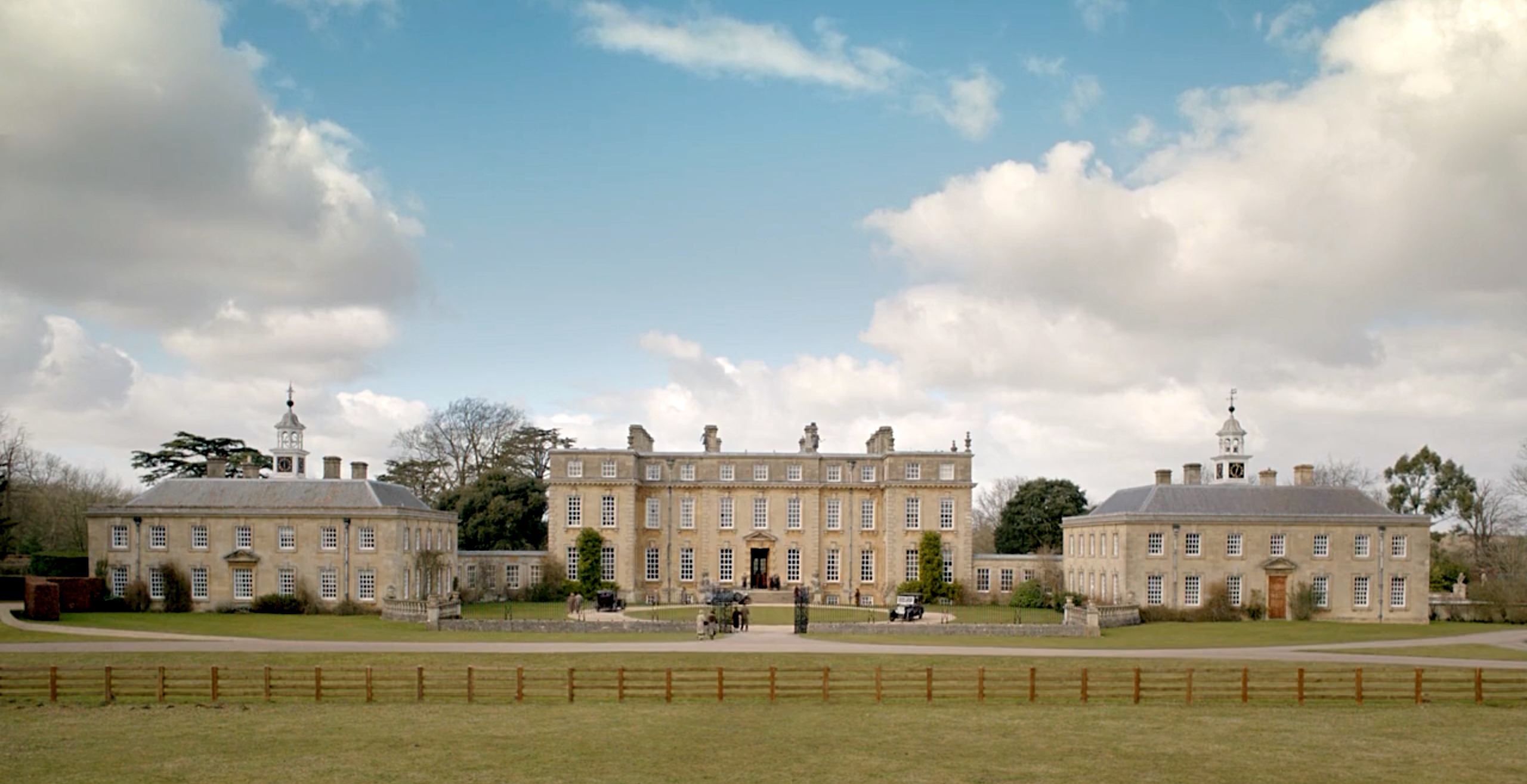
Ditchley House, inherited from the Earl of Lichfield (Lee). (Later used in Downton Abbey as "Mallerton")

On 9 November 1813 his father died at Loughglinn House, County Roscommon, and was buried in the Dillon Vault at Ballyhaunis. Henry succeeded as the 13th Viscount Dillon, at the age of 36, he also inherited Ditchley House, inherited from the Earl of Lichfield (Lee family). Lord Dillon, as he now was, lived with his wife and children in Florence, Italy in the late 1810s and in London in the 1820s where he seems to have had an affair with the writer Eliza Rennie, and where he wrote his two historical novels, Maltravers, published in 1822, and Rosaline de Vere, published in 1824.

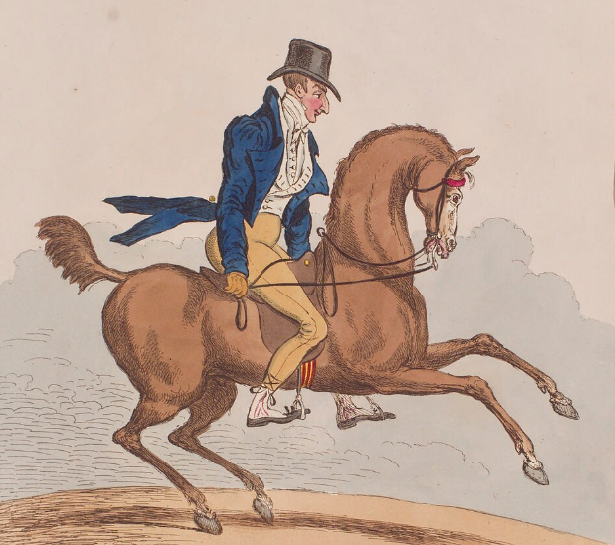
Breaking my own horse (H. A. Dillon) by James Gillray, 1803

Dillon died on 24 July 1832 in London and was buried in the All Saints Church at Spelsbury. He was the first Dillon to be buried in Spelsbury. His widow died thirty years later at the Hotel Windsor, Paris, 18 March 1862, aged 73.

Timeline
Age	Date	Event
0	1777, 28 Oct	Born in Brussels
4	1782, 1 Aug	Mother died
9–10	1787	Father remarried to Marie Rogier
21	1799, 10 Apr	Wins by-election for Harwich
29	1807, Feb	Married Henrietta Browne at Castle MacGarrett near Claremorris, County Mayo, Ireland
36	1813, 9 Nov	Father died at Loughglinn, County Roscommon, Ireland, buried at Ballyhaunis
42	1820, 29 Jan	Accession of King George IV, succeeding King George III
54	1832, 24 Jul	Died in London, buried in Spelsbury

== Works ==
Dillon's published works include:

- Short View of the Catholic Question (London: J. Debrett, 1801), 32 pages
- Letter to the Noblemen and Gentlemen who Composed the Deputation from the Catholics of Ireland on the Subject of their Mission (London: J. Budd, Crown and Mitre, 1805), online at Google Books, 56 pages
- A Commentary on the Military Establishments and Defence of the British Empire (Dillon publisher: Printed by Cox, Son, and Baylis ... for E. Kerby, 1811)
- The Tactics of Ælian: Comprising Military Systems of the Grecians (London: E. Kerby, 1814), online at Google Books
- Discourse upon the Theory of Legitimate Government (Florence, 1817), online at Google Books, 89 pages
- The Life and Opinions of Sir Richard Maltravers: an English Gentleman of the Seventeenth Century, Volume 1 (London: G. and W.B. Whittaker, 1822), online at Google Books Corvey CME 3-628-48097-3; ECB 345; EN2 1822: 29; NSTC 2D13576; OCLC 35663915.
- The life and opinions of Sir Richard Maltravers: an English gentleman of the seventeenth century, Volume 2 (London: G. and W.B. Whittaker, 1822), online at Google Books
- Rosaline de Vere, Volume 1 (London: Treuttel and Würtz, Treuttel junior and Richter, 1824), online at Internet Archive Corvey CME 3-628-48547-9; ECB 502; EN2 1824: 29; NSTC 2D13577; OCLC 12423730.
- Rosaline de Vere, Volume 2 (London: Treuttel and Würtz, Treuttel junior and Richter, 1824), online at Internet Archive

Also: various works of jurisprudence.

== Notes and references ==
=== Sources ===
- Brown, Michael; Power, Thomas P. (2005). Converts and Conversion in Ireland 1650–1850. Dublin: Four Courts Press. ISBN 1-85182-810-9. – Snippet view
- Burke, Bernard; Burke, Ashworth Peter (1915). A Genealogical and Heraldic History of the Peerage and Baronetage, the Privy Council, Knightage and Companionage (77th ed.). London: Harrison. OCLC 1155471554.
- Cokayne, George Edward (1916). Gibbs, Vicary (ed.). The complete peerage of England, Scotland, Ireland, Great Britain and the United Kingdom, extant, extinct, or dormant. Vol. IV (2nd ed.). London: St Catherine Press. OCLC 228661424. – Dacre to Dysart
- Debrett, John (1828). Peerage of the United Kingdom of Great Britain and Ireland. Vol. II (17th ed.). London: F. C. and J. Rivington. OCLC 54499602. – Scotland and Ireland (for Dillon)
- Debrett, John (1838). Courthope, William (ed.). Debrett's Complete Peerage of the United Kingdom of Great Britain and Ireland (22nd ed.). London: F. C. and J. Rivington. OCLC 315551200.
- Foster, Joseph (1891). Alumni Oxonienses: the Members of the University of Oxford, 1715–1886. Vol. I. Oxford: Parker and Co. OCLC 318845. – Abbay to Dyson
- Fryde, Edmund Boleslaw; Greenway, D. E.; Porter, S.; Roy, I., eds. (1986). Handbook of British Chronology. Royal Historical Society Guides and Handbooks, No. 2 (3rd ed.). London: Offices of the Royal Historical Society. ISBN 0-86193-106-8. – (for timeline)
- House of Commons (1878). Return. Members of Parliament – Part II. Parliaments of Great Britain, 1705–1796. Parliaments of the United Kingdom, 1801–1874. Parliaments and Conventions of the Estates of Scotland, 1357–1707. Parliaments of Ireland, 1599–1800. London: His/Her Majesty's Stationery Office. OCLC 13112546.
- La Tour du Pin, Henriette-Lucy, Marquise de (1913a). Journal d'une femme de cinquante ans [Diary of a Woman in her Fifties] (in French). Vol. I (7th ed.). Paris: Librairie Chapelot. OCLC 1047408815.
- La Tour du Pin, Henriette-Lucy, Marquise de (1913b). Journal d'une femme de cinquante ans [Diary of a Woman in her Fifties] (in French). Vol. II (7th ed.). Paris: Librairie Chapelot. OCLC 1047478749.
- Morgan, Henry James (1903). Types of Canadian Women. Vol. I. Toronto: William Briggs. OCLC 1158061117.
- Sunstein, Emily W. (1989). Mary Shelley, Romance and Reality. Boston: Little, Brown & Company. ISBN 0-316-82246-9.
- Sutherland, Gillian (2004). "Stanley (née Dillon-Lee), Henriette Maria, Lady Stanley of Alderley (1807–1895)". In Matthew, Colin; Harrison, Brian (eds.). Oxford Dictionary of National Biography. Vol. 52. New York: Oxford University Press. pp. 210–211. ISBN 0-19-861402-0.

Parliament of Great Britain
Preceded by Richard Hopkins; John Robinson	Member of Parliament for Harwich; 1799–1801; With: John Robinson	Parliament of the United Kingdom
Parliament of the United Kingdom
Parliament of Great Britain	Member of Parliament for Harwich; 1801–1802; With: John Robinson	Succeeded by Thomas Myers; John Robinson
Preceded by Denis Browne; George Jackson	Member of Parliament for County Mayo; 1802–1814; With: Denis Browne	Succeeded by Denis Browne; Dominick Browne
Peerage of Ireland
Preceded by Charles Dillon	Viscount Dillon; 1813–1832	Succeeded by Charles Dillon
