= Edward Duffy =

Edward Duffy may refer to:

- Edward Duffy (athlete) (1883–1918), South African athlete
- Edward Duffy (Fenian) (died 1868), Irish Fenian
- Ed Duffy (1844–1888), baseball player
- Eddie Duffy (1894–1986), Irish musician
- Eddie Duffy, bass guitarist with Simple Minds
