= Diocese of Aude =

Diocese in France (1790 - 1801)

The Diocese of Aude or, more fully, the Diocese of the Department of Aude is a former diocese of the Constitutional Church in France. Created by the civil constitution of the clergy of 1790, it was suppressed following the Concordat of 1801. Its territory was the Department of Aude, with the episcopal seat at Narbonne.

== See also ==
- Guillaume Besaucèle
