= Thérèse-Lucy de Dillon =

French countess and courtier (1751–1782)

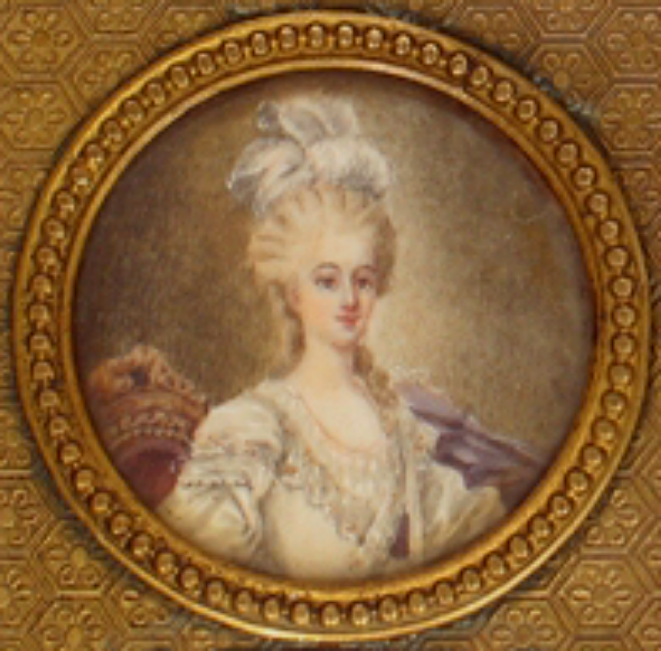
- Born: 1751
- Died: 7 September 1782 (aged 30–31)
- Spouse(s): Arthur Dillon
- Children: Henriette-Lucy, Marquise de La Tour du Pin Gouvernet
- Parent(s): Edward de Rothe, Comte de Rothe; Lucy Cary

Thérèse-Lucy de Dillon (née de Rothe; 2 May 1750 – September 1782), was a French countess and courtier, lady-in-waiting to Queen Marie Antoinette of France (1780–82). She belonged to the intimate circle of friends of the queen and was for a while known as one of her favorites.

== Life ==
She was the maternal niece of the archbishop of Narbonne, Arthur Richard Dillon, and married her first cousin once removed, Count Arthur Dillon (1750–1794) in 1768, and became the mother of Henriette-Lucy, Marquise de La Tour du Pin Gouvernet.

Dillon was described as a beauty, and became one of the favorite companions of Marie Antoinette, as well as one of the close confidantes she invited to her petit cabinets. To keep Dillon close, the queen appointed her dame du palais surnuméraire in 1780, a move that caused great jealousy at court, and for a while, she was reportedly always in the queen's presence. Like the queen's other favorite, the Princesse de Lamballe, who was regarded as having been affiliated with the Palais Royal, Dillon was regarded as a pawn of her uncle the archbishop of Narbonne, upon whom she was economically dependent. She had a relationship with Henri Louis, Prince of Guéméné and was also an intimate friend of her lover's spouse Victoire de Rohan, who was also a personal friend of the queen. The abbé de Vermond reportedly reproached Marie Antoinette for keeping company with women of ill repute like Dillon and Guéméné.

Dillon was eventually taken ill with tuberculosis, to which she succumbed in 1782. During her illness, the queen reportedly visited her on her sickbed and daily sent for news of her friend's illness, and was reportedly devastated upon hearing of her death. However, only one day after the death of Dillon, Marie Antoinette had seemingly recovered from her sorrow and expressed a wish to go to the theater. Louise-Charlotte de Duras, who was sent to advise her against it because she was allegedly the lady-in-waiting the queen respected the most, told her that it would be better if she went to the opera, as the way to the theater was passing near the Saint Sulpice, and she would in that case risk to running into the funeral procession of Madame Dillon along the way. This story was widely circulated, and contributed to the growing bad publicity surrounding the queen, who was viewed negatively for only having mourned a close friend for no more than a day.

== Descendants ==
From her marriage to Dillon, Thérèse-Lucie had a son who died at the age of two, and a daughter: Henriette Lucie Dillon (25 February 1770 – 2 April 1853), who married Frédéric Séraphin de La Tour du Pin Gouvernet, Comte de Gouvernet and had five children, four of whom predeceased her:

1. Frédéric Arthur Humbert de la Tour du Pin Gouvernet (19 May 1790 – 1816)
2. Séraphine de la Tour du Pin Gouvernet (1793 – 1795)
3. Charlotte Alix de la Tour du Pin Gouvernet (4 November 1796 – 1822), who married Auguste de Liedekerke Beaufort and had one son, Hadelin Stanislas Humbert, and one daughter, Cécile Séraphine Claire.
4. Cécile de la Tour du Pin Gouvernet (1800 – 1817)
5. Louis Gabriel Aymar de la Tour du Pin Gouvernet (18 October 1806 – 4 March 1867), who married Caroline Claire de La Bourdonnaye-Blossac and had two sons; Humbert de la Tour du Pin Gouvernet (1855-1943), who had three daughters; and Aymard Charles Marie (1856 - 1870).
