= Charles Dillon, 12th Viscount Dillon =

Irish politician (1745–1813)

The Right Honourable The Viscount Dillon KP PC (Ire)
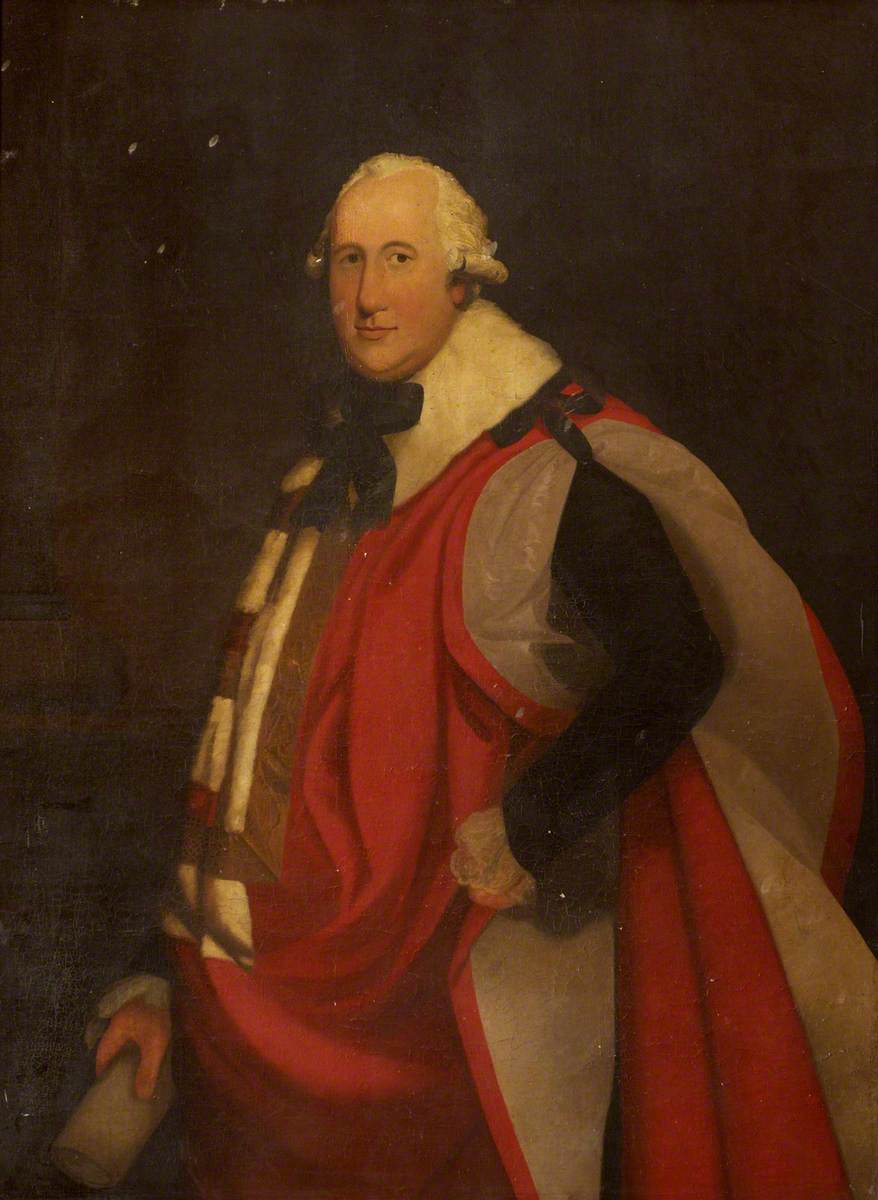
- Portrait by David Martin
- Tenure: 1787–1813
- Predecessor: Henry Dillon, 11th Viscount Dillon
- Successor: Henry Dillon, 13th Viscount Dillon
- Born: 6 November 1745; London
- Died: 9 November 1813 (aged 68); Loughglynn, Ireland
- Spouses: 1. Henrietta-Maria Phipps; 2. Marie Rogier
- Issue Detail: Henry, & others
- Father: Henry Dillon, 11th Viscount Dillon
- Mother: Lady Charlotte Lee

Charles Dillon-Lee, 12th Viscount Dillon, KP, PC (Ire) (6 November 1745 – 9 November 1813) was an Irish politician who represented Westbury in the House of Commons of Great Britain from 1770 to 1774. In 1767, he conformed to the established religion and inherited Ditchley Park in England from his mother.

== Birth and origins ==
Charles was born on 6 November 1745 in London. He was the eldest child of Henry Dillon and his wife Lady Charlotte Lee. His father was the 11th Viscount Dillon.

Charles's mother was the eldest daughter of George Lee, 2nd Earl of Lichfield. His parents had married on 26 October 1744 in London.

He was one of seven siblings, who are listed in his father's article. His two younger brothers, Arthur and Henry, were colonels of Dillon's regiment in France.

== Early life ==
In January 1766 Pope Clement XIII ended the Catholic Church's support for the Jacobites and recognised the Hanoverian Dynasty as the rightful rulers of England. On 4 December 1767, in Dublin, Charles conformed to the established church. In that same year he was also elected a Fellow of the Royal Society.

Charles, in his youth, liked racing and gambling and made huge debts. He moved to Brussels to avoid his debtors.

In 1770 he was elected MP for the Westbury constituency in Wiltshire, England.

In 1776 Charles changed his surname from Dillon to Dillon-Lee and quartered his arms accordingly to comply with the will of his maternal uncle George Lee, 3rd Earl of Lichfield. In that same year, his mother inherited the Lichfield estate at the death of her uncle the fourth Earl, who died childless.

Family tree

Charles Dillon-Lee with his two wives, his parents, and other selected relatives. (Note: This family tree is partly derived from the Dillon family tree pictured in La Tour du Pin. Also see the lists of siblings and children in the text.)

Theobald; 7th Viscount d. 1691; Jacobite	Mary; Talbot d. 1691
Henry; 8th Viscount d. 1714	Arthur; 1670–1733; French; General	Christina; Sheldon; 1684–1757
Richard; 9th Viscount; 1688–1737	Charles; 10th Viscount; 1701–1741	Henry; 11th Viscount; 1705–1787	Charlotte; Lee d. 1794
Henrietta- Maria; Phipps; 1757–1782	Charles; 12th Viscount; 1745–1813	Marie; Rogier d. 1833	Arthur; 1750–1794; French; General
Henry; Augustus; 13th Viscount; 1777–1832	Henrietta; Browne
Charles; Henry; 14th Viscount; 1810–1865	Theobald; Dominick; 15th Viscount; 1811–1879	Arthur; Edmund; 16th Viscount; 1812–1892	Ellen; Adderly; 1809–1896

Legend

XXX	Subject of the article	XXX	Viscounts; Dillon

== First marriage and children ==
Charles married twice. He married firstly on 19 August 1776 in Brussels Henrietta-Maria Phipps, daughter of Constantine Phipps, 1st Baron Mulgrave and his wife Lepel Hervey. She was descended from James II through his illegitimate daughter Lady Catherine Darnley.

Charles and Henrietta Maria had two children:

1. Henry Augustus Dillon-Lee (1777–1832), succeeded him as the 13th Viscount
2. Frances Charlotte Dillon-Lee (1780–1819), married Thomas Webb, Baronet

== Lichfield inheritance ==
On 4 November 1776 Robert Lee, 4th Earl of Lichfield, died and his earldom became extinct. The nearest relatives of the last earl were his nieces. Charles's mother, née Lee, inherited the estate as she was the eldest surviving of these nieces.

== Second marriage and children ==
His first wife died in 1782. In 1787 he married, secondly, Marie Rogier of Mechelen. She had been an actress in Brussels and had been his mistress in the time before his first marriage.

Charles and Marie had at least three children:

1. James William Dillon-Lee (1792–1812), seems to have died unmarried
2. Henrietta Dillon-Lee (died 1811), seems to have died unmarried
3. Charlotte Dillon-Lee (died 1866), married in 1813 Frederick Beauclerk (1773–1850), a younger son of Aubrey Beauclerk, 5th Duke of St Albans and an early cricketer

== Later life ==
In 1787 he served as High Sheriff of Mayo, Ireland. On 3 November 1787, his father, Henry Dillon, 11th Viscount Dillon, died and Charles succeeded as the 12th Viscount Dillon. He was solemnly confirmed in the Viscountcy in 1788 by the Irish House of Lords. He was invested as a Knight of the Order of St. Patrick in 1798.

In 1794 Charles inherited the Lichfield estate from his mother. Ditchley became the seat of the Viscounts Dillon. It would remain in the possession of the family until 1934. During the passing of the Acts of Union 1800 Lord Dillon supported the union.

In 1802 Lord Dillon sold the manor of Quarendon, where the seat of the Lee family had once stood, to James Du Pré of Wilton Park. Quarendon was of course part of the land inherited from his mother. In 1806 Lord Dillon raised a regiment, namely the 101st Regular, recruited from the inhabitants of his Irish lands and surrounding areas near Loughglinn, County Roscommon.

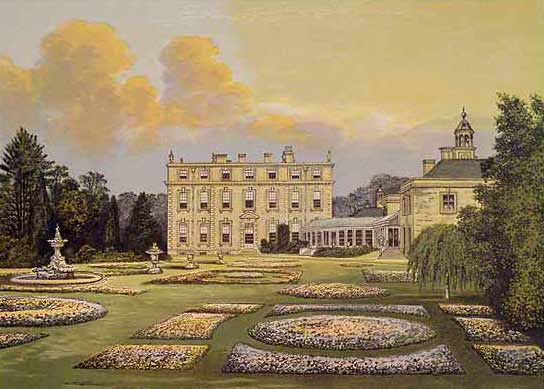
Ditchley House, the seat of the Lee family

== Death, succession, and timeline ==
Lord Dillon died at Loughglinn, on 9 November 1813. Despite his conversion, he was buried in the Dillon Family Vault in the Cemetery at the Augustinian Friary, Ballyhaunis, County Mayo, Ireland. His widow died in London in 1833. He was succeeded by his only son, Henry Augustus, as the 13th Viscount Dillon.

Timeline
Age	Date	Event
0	1745, 6 Nov	Born in London
14	1760, 25 Oct	Accession of King George III, succeeding King George II
22	1767, 4 Dec	Conformed to the established religion
30	1776, 19 Aug	Married, 1stly, Henrietta Maria Phipps, in Brussels
30	1776, 4 Nov	Mother inherited from Robert Lee, the 4th Earl of Lichfield.
36	1782, 1 Aug	First wife died.
41–42	1787	Married, 2ndly, Marie Rogier
41	1787, 3 Nov	Succeeded his father as the 12th Viscount Dillon'.
42	1788, 18 Mar	Confirmed as Viscount by the Irish House of Lords.
48–49	1794	Inherited the Lichfield estate from his mother
68	1813, 9 Nov	Died at Loughglinn, County Roscommon, Ireland

== Notes and references ==
=== Sources ===
- Brown, Michael; Power, Thomas P. (2005). Converts and Conversion in Ireland 1650–1850. Dublin: Four Courts Press. ISBN 1-85182-810-9.
- Burke, Bernard (1883). A Genealogical History of the Dormant, Abeyant, Forfeited and Extinct Peerages of the British Empire (New ed.). London: Harrison. OCLC 499232768.
- Burke, Bernard; Burke, Ashworth Peter (1915). A Genealogical and Heraldic History of the Peerage and Baronetage, the Privy Council, Knightage and Companionage (77th ed.). London: Harrison. OCLC 1155471554.
- Cokayne, George Edward (1916). Gibbs, Vicary (ed.). The complete peerage of England, Scotland, Ireland, Great Britain and the United Kingdom, extant, extinct, or dormant. Vol. IV (2nd ed.). London: St Catherine Press. OCLC 228661424. – Dacre to Dysart
- Debrett, John (1828). Peerage of the United Kingdom of Great Britain and Ireland. Vol. II (17th ed.). London: F. C. and J. Rivington. OCLC 54499602. – Scotland and Ireland (for Dillon)
- Debrett, John (1838). Courthope, William (ed.). Debrett's Complete Peerage of the United Kingdom of Great Britain and Ireland (22nd ed.). London: F. C. and J. Rivington. OCLC 315551200.
- Fryde, Edmund Boleslaw; Greenway, D. E.; Porter, S.; Roy, I., eds. (1986). Handbook of British Chronology. Royal Historical Society Guides and Handbooks, No. 2 (3rd ed.). London: Offices of the Royal Historical Society. ISBN 0-86193-106-8. – (for timeline)
- House of Commons (1878). Return. Members of Parliament – Part II. Parliaments of Great Britain, 1705–1796. Parliaments of the United Kingdom, 1801–1874. Parliaments and Conventions of the Estates of Scotland, 1357–1707. Parliaments of Ireland, 1599–1800. London: His/Her Majesty's Stationery Office. OCLC 13112546. – (for the subject as MP)
- La Tour du Pin, Henriette-Lucy, Marquise de (1913a). Journal d'une femme de cinquante ans [Diary of a Woman in her Fifties] (in French). Vol. I (7th ed.). Paris: Librairie Chapelot. OCLC 1047408815.
- La Tour du Pin, Henriette-Lucy, Marquise de (1913b). Journal d'une femme de cinquante ans [Diary of a Woman in her Fifties] (in French). Vol. II (7th ed.). Paris: Librairie Chapelot. OCLC 1047478749.
- MacDougall, Henry (1799). Sketches of Irish Political Characters of the Present Day. London: P. O'Shea Publisher. OCLC 642449386.
- O'Callaghan, John Cornelius (1854). History of the Irish Brigades in the Service of France. New York: P. O'Shea Publisher. OCLC 1046538374.

Parliament of Great Britain
Preceded by Peregrine Bertie; William Blackstone	Member of Parliament for Westbury; 1770–1774; With: Peregrine Bertie	Succeeded by Thomas Wenman; Nathaniel Bayly
Peerage of Ireland
Preceded by Henry Dillon	Viscount Dillon; 1787–1813	Succeeded by Henry Dillon-Lee
