= R325 road =

R325 road may refer to:

- R325 road (Ireland)
- R325 road (South Africa)
