= Loughglinn =

Village in County Roscommon, Ireland

Loughglinn Loch Glinne (Irish)
- Village
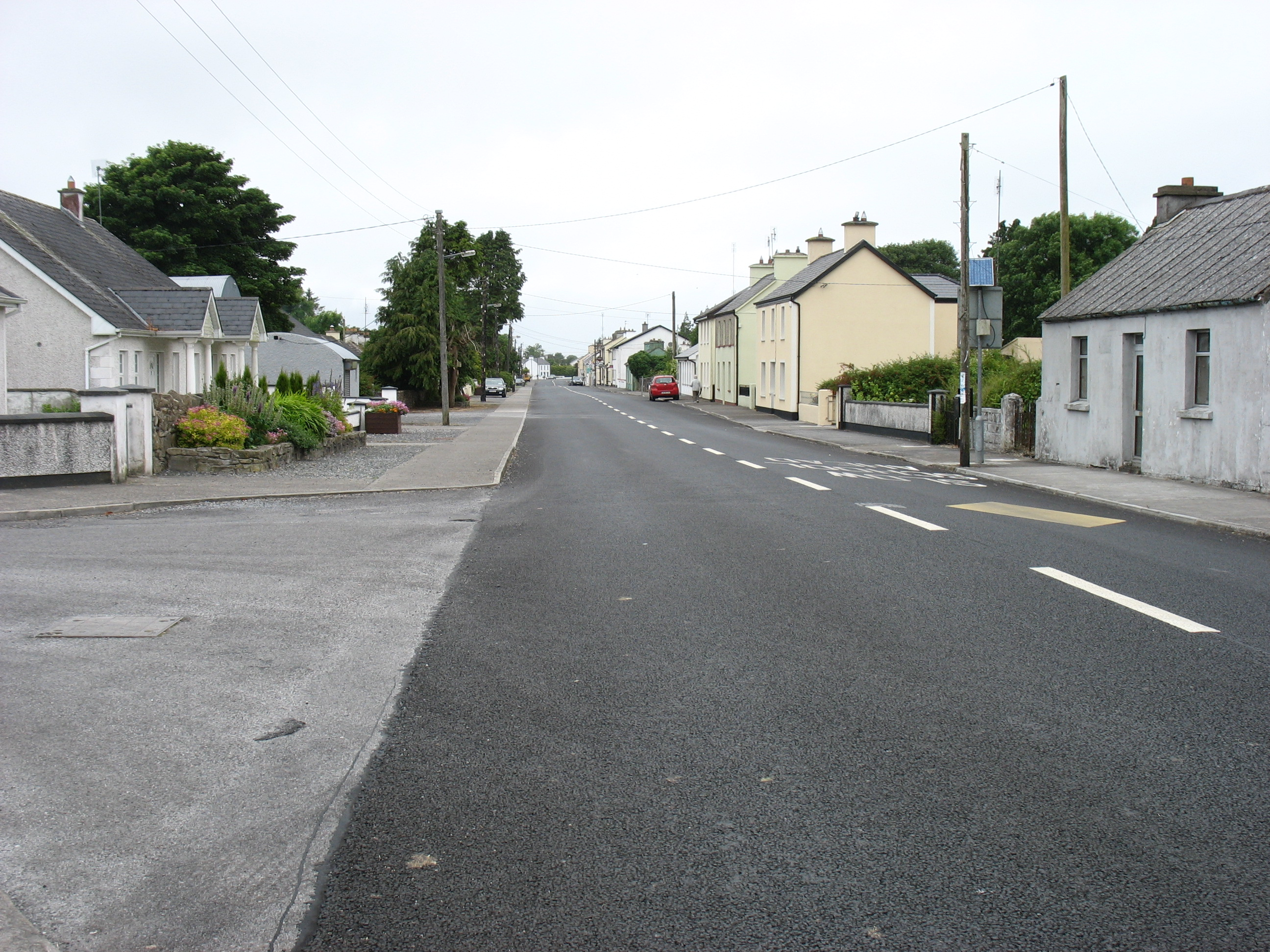
- The R325 road passes through Loughglinn

- Location in Ireland
- Coordinates: 53°49′N 8°33′W
- Country: Ireland
- Province: Connacht
- County: County Roscommon

Population (2016)
  - Total: 184

Loughglinn or Loughglynn (/lɒxˈɡlɪn/ lokh-GLIN; Irish: Loch Glinne) is a village in County Roscommon, Ireland. It is named after the lake to the north of the village.

== Location ==
Loughglinn is in the west of County Roscommon, on the R325 road between Castlerea and Ballaghaderreen. Lough Glinn (the lake) is a few hundred metres north of the village. The nearest town is Castlerea, 7 km to the south (9 km by road).

== History ==
Loughglinn House was the main residence of the Dillon family, built circa 1715, extended in the 1820s and altered again in the early 20th century. It is recorded in 1814, 1837 and in Griffith's Valuation as the seat of Viscount Dillon. The Dillons were absentee landlords for much of the nineteenth century and their agent, Charles Strickland, lived in the house.

In 1806 Lord Dillon, Charles Dillon, 12th Viscount Dillon, raised the 101st Regiment of Foot, recruited from the inhabitants in and around Loughglinn.

Ned Duffy of Loughglinn (born 22 August 1840) was a Fenian organiser of the 19th century. He died in Millbank Prison 17 January 1868. Jeremiah O'Donovan Rossa was in Millbank when he died and penned a famous lament some of the lines include "In the dead house you are lying, and I'd wake you if I could, but they'll 'wake' you in Loughglinn, 'Ned, In the cottage by the wood." There is a monument to Ned Duffy near the old school which was unveiled by Minister for Justice Brian Lenihan TD in the 1960s.

On 19 April 1921 four Irish Republican Army men were staying in a house near Loughglinn wood. When they learned that the Black and Tans were combing the wood, under Captain McKay of the Leicestershire Regiment, the four men attempted to escape. Two were wounded, Joe Satchwell and Thomas (Toby) Scally. Following a drumhead court-martial the others, John Bergin and Stephen McDermott were shot. There is a monument to all from the locality who gave their lives during the War of Independence across from the church known as Mother Éireann.

On 7 July 1980, two Gardaí, Detective Garda John Morley and Garda Henry Byrne, were murdered at Shannon's Cross, Loughglinn following an armed robbery of the Bank of Ireland in Ballaghadereen. Two other Gardaí, Sgt Mick O'Malley and Garda Derek O'Kelly survived the shoot out. There is now a memorial at Shannon's Cross in commemoration of the deaths.

== Features ==
The local national school, with a Green Schools flag, is Scoil Mhuire Lourdes and was opened as a three-teacher school in the early 1960s. It is now a four-teacher school and has won the 3-4 teacher schools GAA county final a number of times. The village no longer has a Garda station as the station was renovated in December 2011 and its closure was announced while renovations were carried out. It closed in April 2012. The building is now an ambulance station. There are also two public houses, two shops, a funeral home, a community centre with a play school, a Catholic Church (Our Lady of Good Counsel). The lake is also the source of the name of the village.

== Sport ==
The local Gaelic Athletic Association (GAA) club is Éire Óg, which was formed in 1984 and who play their home games at James Timothy Memorial Park. Loughglinn was formerly home to a football club, Loughglinn United FC. Their pitch was situated behind the Church, beside the lake. Loughglinn Boxing Club train in the Community Centre. Loughglinn Badminton Club play in the community centre.

== Church ==
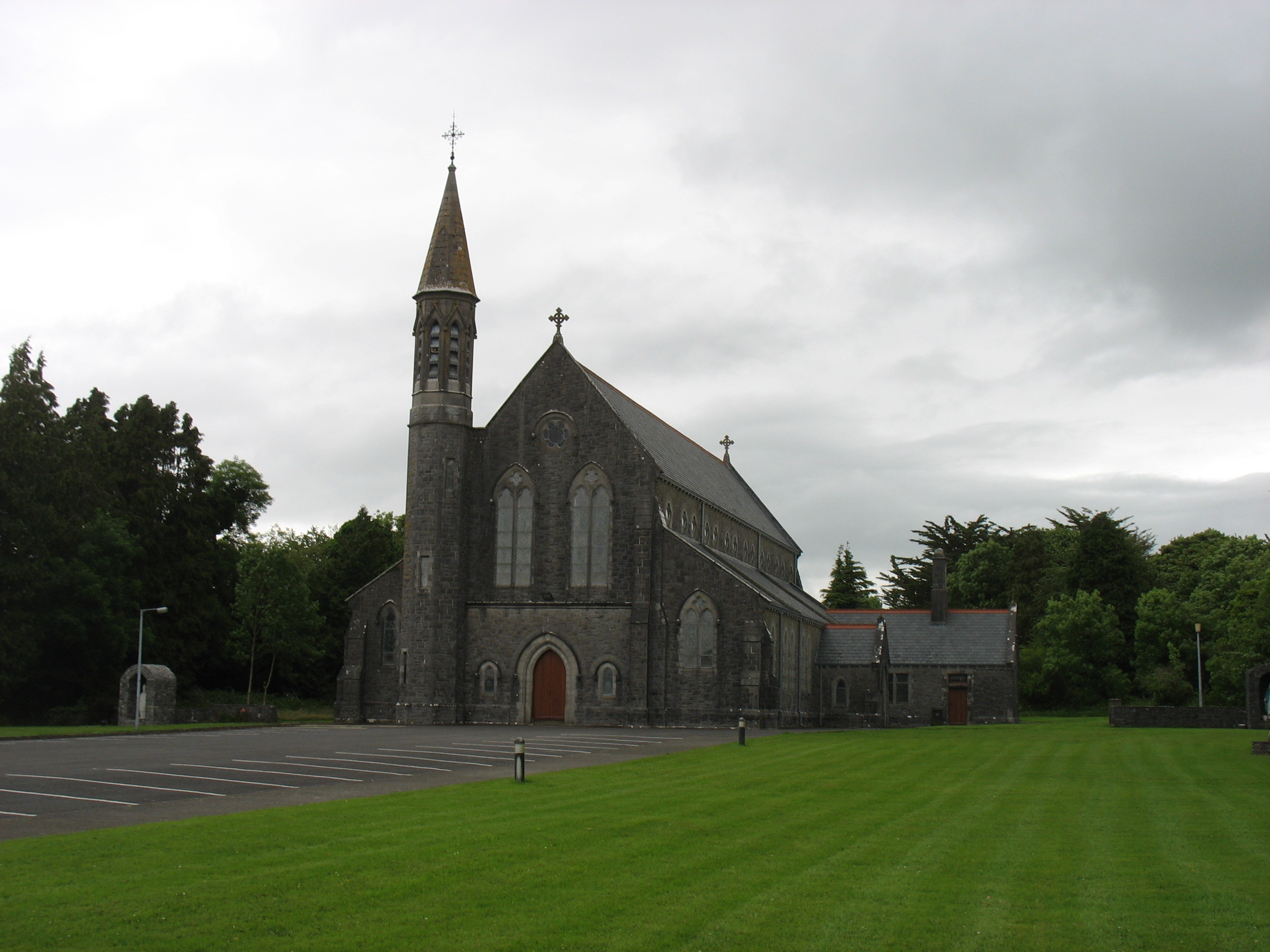
Church of Our Lady of Good Counsel, Loughglinn

In 1798 a barn church was built in Loughglinn near the priest's graveyard, by an early monastery It served the needs until the present Church of Our Lady of Good Counsel was built in 1905 and dedicated in 1906. It was built in a Gothic style featuring a striking octagonal bell turret with a spire, polished granite interior pillars, and richly molded arches. It was designed by William Byrne and was built using local stone and labour.

Our Lady of Good Counsel was built in 1905 The church comprises side aisles, sacristy to rear, projecting entrance porches to side aisles and octagonal bell tower to front elevation. There are stepped buttresses to the front façade and rear elevations.

== Convent ==
In 1903, Loughglinn house was sold to the Bishop of Elphin Dr Clancy who invited the Franciscan Missionaries of Mary to establish a convent, and there started a school where teenage girls would learn Home Economics. The sisters established a dairy and Loughglinn butter and cheese was famous all over the world until they ceased this activity in the 1960s. They then opened a nursing home for their own retired sisters and also had residents who were not nuns and known locally as the patients.

In 2003, developer Gerry Gannon bought the convent for under €2m, intending to turn it into a hotel. In 2009, after the Irish property bubble burst, it was transferred to his wife's name.

== In popular culture ==
The local anthem is the "Woodlands of Loughglinn" dedicated to the memory of those that died in the Woodlands in April 1921. It was written by Ms. Mary Anne Regan of Kilgarve, Castlerea, sister of the late Kathleen Devine, a record of which is in the archives of the Roscommon Herald. The song has been recorded by Brendan Shine, among others.

== People ==
- Michael Barrett, former TD
- Thomas O Doherty, former Bishop of Galway
- Thomas Henry Wyatt (9 May 1807 – 5 August 1880), architect
- Charles Dillon, 12th Viscount Dillon
- Sr Maura O Connor Superior General Franciscan Missionaries of Mary 1984 until 1996.

== See also ==
- List of towns and villages in Ireland
