= Harold Dillon, 17th Viscount Dillon =

British antiquarian

The Right Honourable The Viscount Dillon CH FBA FSA
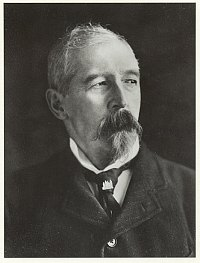

Chairman of the National Portrait Gallery
- In office 1894–1928

President of the Society of Antiquaries of London
- In office 1897–1904

President of the Royal Archaeological Institute
- In office 1892–1898

Personal details
- Born: Harold Arthur Lee-Dillon; 24 January 1844 Victoria Square, Westminster, London, England
- Died: 18 December 1932 (aged 88)

Harold Arthur Lee-Dillon, 17th Viscount Dillon, CH, FBA, FSA (24 January 1844 – 18 December 1932) was an English antiquary and a leading authority on the history of arms and armour and medieval costume.

== Life ==
The eldest son of Arthur Dillon, 16th Viscount Dillon, he was born in Victoria Square, Westminster, and educated at private school and at the University of Bonn, Germany. He purchased an Ensigncy in the Rifle Brigade in 1862 and a Lieutenancy in 1866. He served in India and Canada, but resigned his commission in 1874. He then joined the Oxfordshire Militia (later the 4th (Oxford Militia) Battalion, Oxfordshire Light Infantry) as a captain. He was promoted Major in 1885 and retired in 1891. He succeeded his father as The 17th Viscount Dillon in 1892.

After leaving the regular army he devoted himself to antiquarian study, writing over fifty books and articles. He was chairman of the trustees of the National Portrait Gallery from 1894 to 1928. In the first year, his portrait was painted by Georgina Brackenbury. He bequeathed to the trustees various portraits from Ditchley Park, Charlbury including the portrait of his ancestor Sir Henry Lee by Antonio Moro. He served as Curator of the Royal Armouries from 1892 to 1913.

He was President of the Royal Archaeological Institute from 1892 to 1898 and President of the Society of Antiquaries of London from 1897 to 1904. He was the founding president of the Society for Army Historical Research holding the position until his death. He was elected a founding Fellow of the British Academy in 1902. He was also appointed antiquary to the Royal Academy.

He was appointed to the Order of the Companions of Honour (CH) in the 1921 Birthday Honours for his work with the National Portrait Gallery.

His only son predeceased him and he was succeeded by his nephew, Arthur.

== Ancestry ==
Harold Dillon, 17th Viscount Dillon's ancestors in three generations
Harold Arthur Dillon-Lee, 17th Viscount Dillon	Father: Arthur Edmund Dennis Dillon-Lee, 16th Viscount Dillon	Paternal Grandfather: Henry Augustus Dillon-Lee, 13th Viscount Dillon	Paternal Great-grandfather: Charles Dillon-Lee, 12th Viscount Dillon
Harold Arthur Dillon-Lee, 17th Viscount Dillon	Father: Arthur Edmund Dennis Dillon-Lee, 16th Viscount Dillon	Paternal Grandfather: Henry Augustus Dillon-Lee, 13th Viscount Dillon	Paternal Great-grandmother: Henrietta Maria Phipps
Harold Arthur Dillon-Lee, 17th Viscount Dillon	Father: Arthur Edmund Dennis Dillon-Lee, 16th Viscount Dillon	Paternal Grandmother: Henrietta Browne	Paternal Great-grandfather: Dominick-Geoffrey Browne
Harold Arthur Dillon-Lee, 17th Viscount Dillon	Father: Arthur Edmund Dennis Dillon-Lee, 16th Viscount Dillon	Paternal Grandmother: Henrietta Browne	Paternal Great-grandmother: Margaret Browne
Harold Arthur Dillon-Lee, 17th Viscount Dillon	Mother: Ellen Adderly	Maternal Grandfather: James Adderly	Maternal Great-grandfather: ?
Harold Arthur Dillon-Lee, 17th Viscount Dillon	Mother: Ellen Adderly	Maternal Grandfather: James Adderly	Maternal Great-grandmother: ?
Harold Arthur Dillon-Lee, 17th Viscount Dillon	Mother: Ellen Adderly	Maternal Grandmother: Ellen Williams	Maternal Great-grandfather: John Williams of Hythe, co. Kent
Harold Arthur Dillon-Lee, 17th Viscount Dillon	Mother: Ellen Adderly	Maternal Grandmother: Ellen Williams	Maternal Great-grandmother: ?

Peerage of Ireland
Preceded by Arthur Dillon	Viscount Dillon; 1892–1932	Succeeded by Arthur Dillon
