= Catholic Irish Brigade (1794–1798) =

The Catholic Irish Brigade was a brigade of the British Army raised during the French Revolutionary Wars, raised mostly from former members of the French Royal Army's Irish Brigade due to a series of rare changes in British and French policy.

== Context ==
The success of the Irish Brigade in France from 1690 to 1791 came to an unexpected end during the French Revolution, as it had always sworn loyalty only to King Louis XVI, and the former kings, as distinct from the French people. Louis was re-titled as "King of the French" and was then deposed on 10 August 1792 and within months he had been tried and sentenced to death.

The Irish Brigade regiments lost their distinctive uniforms and were renamed and renumbered in 1791, and some of their officers were also executed, such as Théobald Dillon in 1792 and Arthur Dillon. As royalists and Roman Catholics, they were hostile to the dechristianization of France during the French Revolution and the whole concept of the French First Republic.

== Establishment ==
When the War of the First Coalition included Britain from February 1793, it was not so surprising that many in the Brigade came to think of supporting their ancient enemy. The British Prime Minister William Pitt the Younger had recently tried to end Catholic grievances by promoting the Roman Catholic Relief Act 1793 enacted by the Irish Parliament. He supported the creation of St Patrick's College, Maynooth in 1795, allowing Catholic priests to be trained in Ireland. These were considerable reforms of the formerly harsh penal laws.

Pitt invited several Irish Brigade officers to London in 1794 and offered to set up a "Catholic Irish Brigade", envisaged as 6 regiments that would be raised in Ireland and led by men such as Count Daniel Charles O'Connell (an uncle of Daniel O'Connell). This was agreed and formalised. However, recruitment was hampered by hostility and fear from the Protestant Ascendancy at the idea of raising such a brigade, competition from the Irish Militia, whose members would serve at home (see Militia (Ireland) Act 1802), and also some ridicule from the new and pro-French republican United Irishmen.

Other officers, such as Henry Dillon, had no previous affiliation with France, but were cousins of, or descended from, officers of the formerly-French Irish Brigade.

== Saint-Domingue ==
In 1792, several regiments of the French Irish Brigade were sent to the colony of Saint-Domingue in the Caribbean as part of efforts to suppress a slave rebellion there. Assisted by local Irish-origin slave-owners they lost a skirmish at Les Plantons, and started local massacres to cow the population. Republican commissioner Léger-Félicité Sonthonax arrived in Saint-Dominigue from France in 1792 and proceeded to issue several emancipation decrees. Irish Brigade troops in Saint-Dominigue subsequently switched sides and assisted a British invasion of the colony which began in 1793; Pitt authorised payments to these defectors. Some former Irish Brigade officers also began serving in the British Army's West India Regiments. After five years of attempting to capturing Saint-Domingue, during which they suffered massive casualties to tropical diseases, the British signed a treaty in 1798 with Toussaint Louverture promising to evacuate, and in return Louverture promised not to foment unrest in Britain's Caribbean colonies. As well as Saint-Domingue, other units of the Catholic Irish Brigade were established in 1795 and posted to safer but more tedious and unglamorous garrison duties in places such as Nova Scotia.

== Summary ==
While the Brigade only lasted for 4 years, with a maximum strength of 4,500 men, it demonstrated Pitt's understanding that many Irish Catholics would support his war against the French republican state. Losses from disease, difficulties in recruitment, competition from other formations and the outbreak of the Irish Rebellion of 1798 all ended Pitt's experiment.

It can be contrasted with the Napoleonic Irish Legion that served France from 1803 to 1815.

== Bibliography ==
- McDonnell, Ciarán (April 2016). "A 'Fair Chance'? The Catholic Irish Brigade in the British Service, 1793–1798". War in History. 23 (2): 155–168. doi:10.1177/0968344514559872. S2CID 155436332.
