= Eliza Rennie =

Scottish-born romantic and gothic short story author

Eliza Rennie/ Mrs. Eliza Walker
- Born: May 17, 1813; Aberdeen, Scotland
- Died: Unknown, but after 1869
- Occupation: Author
- Writing career
- Notable work: Traits of Character

Eliza Rennie or (later) Mrs. Eliza Walker was a minor Scottish-born romantic and gothic short story author most notable for writing about her friendship with Mary Shelley and her contemporaries, including meetings with such celebrities as the Duke of Wellington.

Her biography remains somewhat of a mystery. She was possibly born on 17 May 1813, spent most of her adult life in London, and died sometime after 30 March 1869, when she was awarded £25 by the Royal Literary Fund. She published a two-volume autobiographical work of literary gossip entitled Traits of Character: being Twenty-Five Years' Literary and Personal Recollections, by a Contemporary.

== Biography ==
It has proven difficult to trace the ancestry and parentage Eliza Rennie, as no contemporary accounts have been found. The following biography is therefore tentative and incomplete, deduced from a comparison of published local and family histories, clues left by Eliza in her own writings, and a search of parish records and census data.

Although Mary Shelley's biographer, Emily W. Sunstein, claims that Eliza was born to the famous engineering family Rennie, of John Rennie the Elder and his sons George and John, no corroborating evidence has been found.

One possible matching birth record between 1805 and 1820 has been found of an Elizabeth Rennie born on 17 May 1813 to Alexander Rennie and Jean Taylor in the village of Udny, Aberdeenshire. Her father was therefore almost certainly Alexander Home Stirling Rennie, born on 13 June 1797 in Kilsyth, Scotland, a physician who studied medicine at Marischal College, Aberdeen, and upon qualification moved to London between about 1818 and 1820. If her mother was the same Jean Taylor born on 8 June 1798 in Larbert, a few miles from Kilsyth, then Eliza's parents were teenagers when she was born. It is possible that the young couple either eloped or were sent away to a remote area to avoid the stigma of illegitimacy.

If the above identifications are correct, then Eliza's grandfather was Robert Rennie of Kilsyth (1762–1820), a minister of the Church of Scotland, author of treatises on the topic of peat moss, and a contributor to the Statistical Accounts of Scotland. The family was sufficiently distinguished to be the subject of a page or two in Reverend Anton's Kilsyth: a parish history.

It seems likely from Eliza's Poems that her mother died when she was very young, though no death record has been traced. She describes a rural childhood with mixed feelings and may have spent some time being cared for by family members in Kilsyth. She was very unhappy, felt betrayed, and apparently moved to London to join her father, possibly following the death of her grandfather in 1824. She spent the rest of her life in London and the home counties, never losing her Scottish identity.

Her first definite published work was Poems (1828), released when she was a teenager, possibly as young as thirteen or fourteen. Although it received mixed reviews, it was sufficiently promising to gain her access to literary salons and the companionship of leading figures of the day.

She may have been the lover of Lord Henry Dillon, one of the early patrons about whom she wrote extensively in Traits of Character.

== Life with Mary Shelley and her friends ==
As a teenaged published author in London with a father who had already achieved some professional and social success, Rennie appears to have had many admirers and friends, including Mary Shelley and her literary set. Rennie wrote of Shelley that she was "almost morbidly averse to the least allusion to herself as an authoress."

In Traits of Character, she describes a meeting with the Duke of Wellington, with whom she discussed her father and his support of William Wilberforce and the antislavery movement. Her idealism and campaigning activities extended to animal rights activism and other causes. She was a regular churchgoer and interested in Spiritualism.

== Later life ==
Her father married in 1829, and the household moved to the country in 1834. Her father died in 1838 in a fall from a horse, leaving a widow and at least two young children.

Eliza herself most likely married around 1830, as from the early 1830s Eliza published under the name Mrs Eliza Walker. The first known record of her using this name is in 1831, in The Gem, A Literary Annual. As Mr Walker is never mentioned in her own narratives, the marriage may have ended prematurely or been a sham. She herself claimed in applications for financial assistance that the marriage was bigamous, and that her fortune was embezzled by "her brother". The Royal Literary Fund archive record stored in the British Library refers to her making four applications for relief, dated 28 Jun 1854 (£30), 25 Jan 1861 (rejected), 30 Mar 1863 (£25), and 30 Mar 1869 (£25).

Nothing else is known about her later private or professional life apart from her own rare autobiographical insights in Traits of Character. She describes a life in London and Scottish society with excursions to spa towns and meetings with celebrities and her publishers. She produced a steady string of short stories for the periodicals of the day, and also writes about receiving a small legacy, possibly from her father's estate or from one of her wealthy admirers. She also writes about her inordinate fondness for her pet terrier, which was dognapped on two occasions for ransom (apparently a popular crime in London in the mid-19th century).

Her place and date of death are unknown, and further research is needed.

Mary Shelley refers to her just once in her own correspondence.

== Writings ==
- The Destroyer, The Museum of Foreign Literature and Science, Volume 13.
- Poems by Eliza Rennie, London: Lloyd, 1828 1 vol: viii, 182p. ISBN 3-628-54442-4
- Traits of Character – Being Twenty-Five Years' Literary and Personal Recollections, by a Contemporary . Eliza Rennie, 2 volumes London: Hurst and Blackett, 1860

== Sources ==
- Rennie, A. 1828. A Treatise on Gout, Apoplexy, Paralysis, and Disorders of the Nervous System, London: Burgess and Hill
- Lives of the Great Romantics III Godwin, Wollstonecraft & Mary Shelley by their Contemporaries 3 Volume Set
- Pseudonymity, Passing, and Queer Biography: The Case of Mary Diana Dods, Geraldine Friedman
- Emily W Sunstein. A Different Face: the Life of Mary Wollstonecraft. Boston: Little, Brown and Co., 1975. ISBN 0-06-014201-4.
