= Guillaume Besaucèle =

Constitutional bishop of Aude (1712 - 1801)

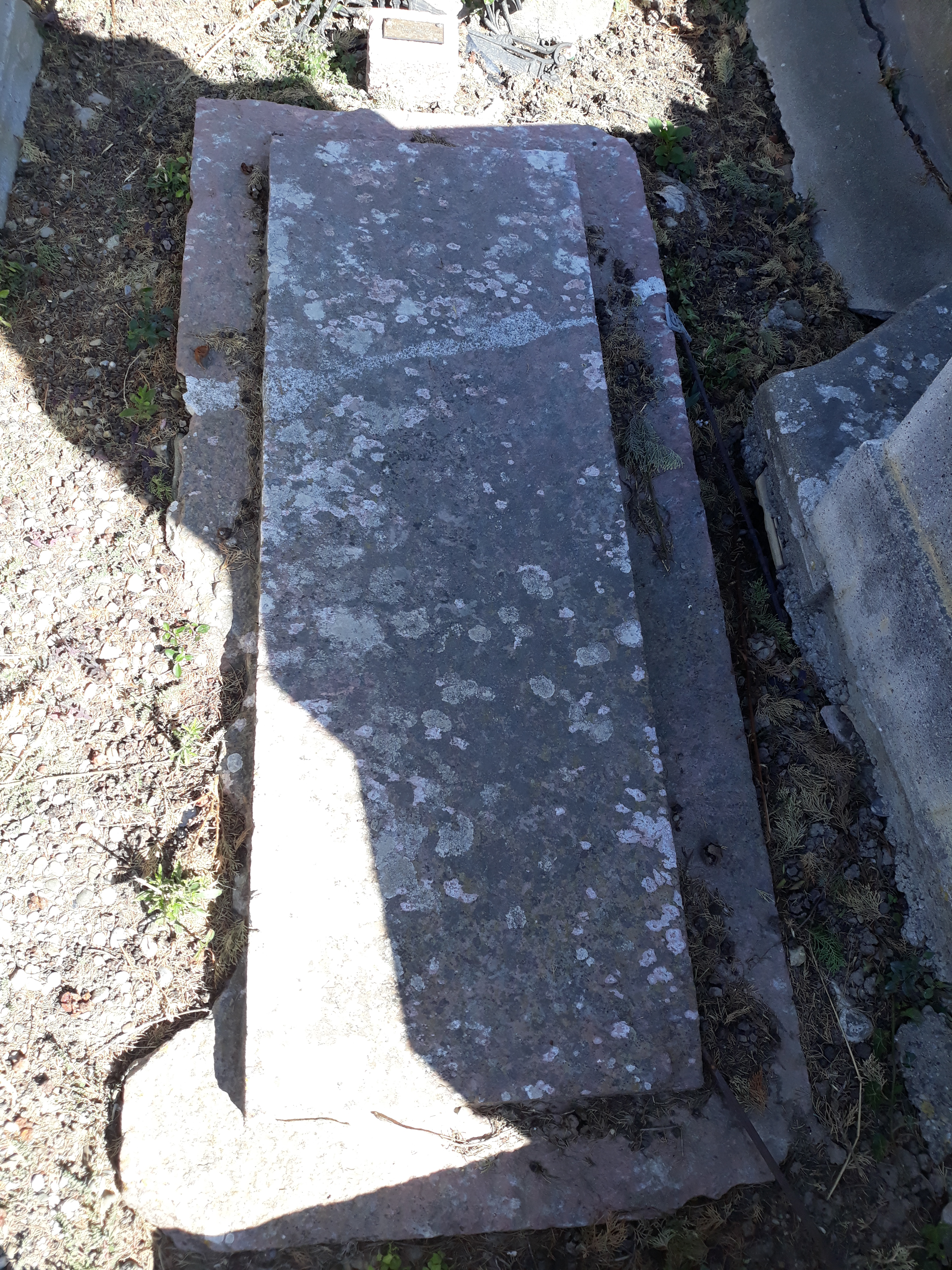
Grave of Guillaume Besaucèle

Guillaume Besaucèle (Saissac, 3 September 1712 – Carcassonne, 4 February 1801) was an ecclesiastic who was constitutional bishop of Aude from 1791 to 1801.

== Biography ==
Guillaume Besaucèle was pastor of Limousis before becoming the vicar general of Armand Bazin de Bezons, bishop of Carcassonne clearly Jansenist, then canon and finally dean of the chapter of the cathedral.

During the French Revolution, he pronounced for the Civil Constitution of the clergy to mark his opposition to the former bishop Jean Auguste of Chastenet de Puységur and at the age of 79, he was elected constitutional bishop of the diocese of Aude, established by the revolutionary government, which partially included the diocese of Narbonne and four former bishoprics of Carcassonne, Alet, Saint-Papoul and Mirepoix. To avoid too long a trip, he was crowned in Toulouse on 15 May 1791. The episcopal see is first fixed in the old metropolitan church of Narbonne. The new elect, despite his age, undertakes a general visit of his diocese which includes no less than 567 parishes. He realized only 3/4 of his program during the suppression of the cults in 1793. He is not worried during the Terror and resumes his functions in February 1795 while fixing however his residence in Carcassonne which he estimates more Central. He adheres to the encyclicals and sends deputies to the Council of 1797.

He had difficulties in leading his vast diocese and he sets up separate administrations for the four bishoprics that compose him and is surrounded by 22 vicars general. In 1797 he suffered a stroke and on 17 July 1797 at the meeting of a synod of the Southern Metropolis and it becomes clear that he is better able to administer his diocese. The metropolitan imposes on him a coadjutor in the person of Louis Belmas, the priest of Castelnaudary whom he crowned 26 October 1800.

The old bishop died on 4 February 1801. He was buried in the cemetery of the city of Carcassonne in the same tomb as Bishop de Bezons.
