= Charles Strickland (town planner) =

Irish urban planner

Charles Strickland (1818–1892) was the local agent and town planner in County Mayo for Lord Dillon. He was the founder of the settlement of Charlestown. In 1860 he helped build the Cathedral of Ballaghaderreen where his memory is commemorated in the architecture.

He founded a town in Mayo adjoining the existing settlement of Bellaghy in County Sligo. Mayo farmers, including tenants of Lord Dillon, were disadvantaged by the rules of the existing market in Bellaghy. They complained to Lord Dillon's local agent Strickland, who conspired to build a new town where the Mayo farmers could sell their produce within a short walk of the established market.

The town was originally named Newtown Dillon but was renamed Charlestown in Strickland's honour.

In 1860 The Bishop of Achonry among others installed a window in a chapel at the cathedral to commemorate Strickland of Loughlynn and his wife Maria for their assistance in the construction of the cathedral.

He was the son of Jarrard Edward Strickland III, also of Loughglynn House, which he inherited.
