= Arthur Dillon (1750–1794) =

French Army officer, colonial administrator and politician (1750–1794)

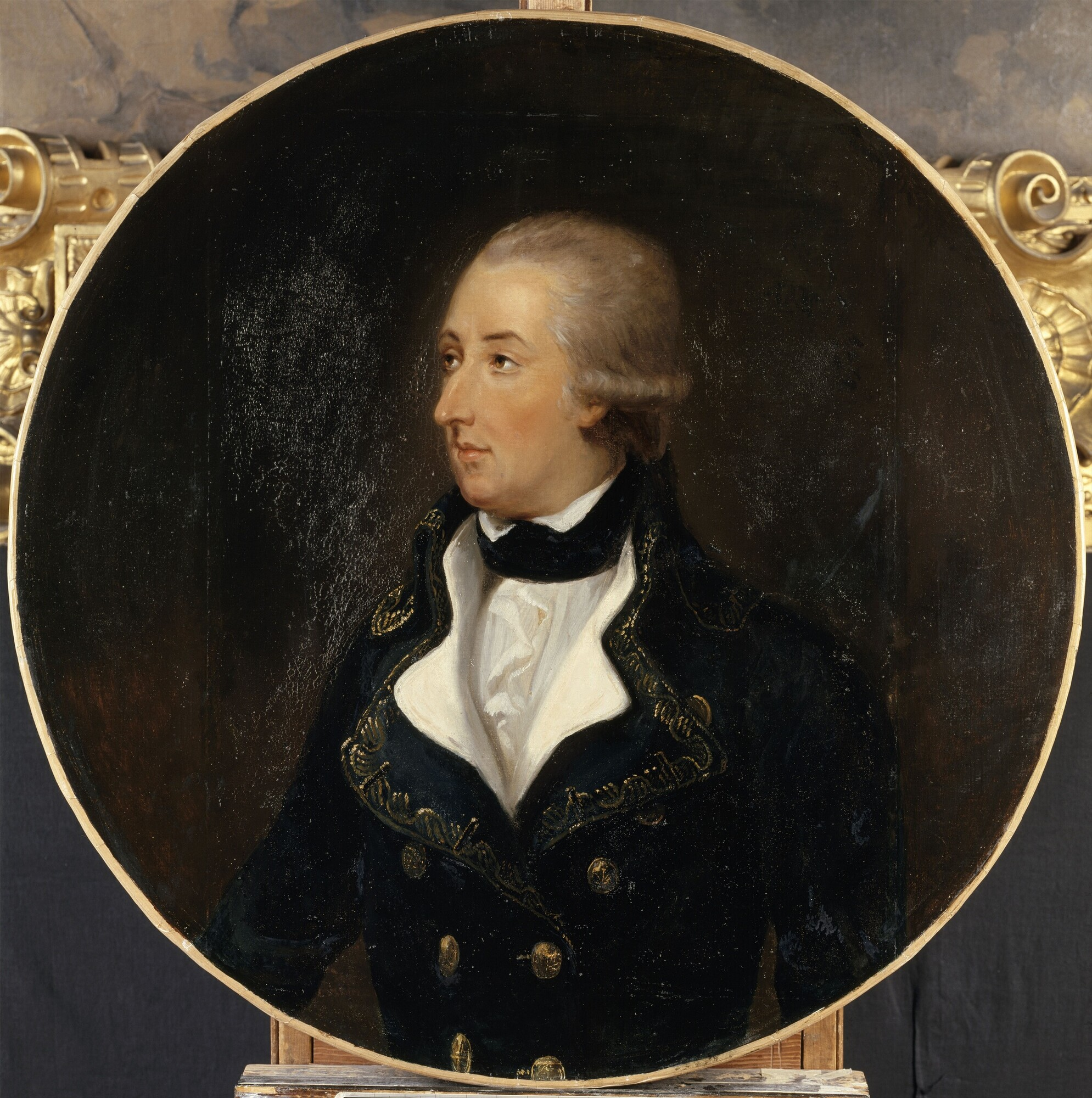
- Painting by Jean-Hilaire Belloc, 1834
- Born: 3 September 1750; Braywick, Berkshire
- Died: 13 April 1794 (aged 43); Paris, France
- Spouse: Thérèse-Lucy de Dillon
- Children: 8, including Henriette-Lucy and Fanny
- Relatives: Henry Dillon, 11th Viscount Dillon (father)
- Military career
- Allegiance: Kingdom of France; Kingdom of France (French First Republic) French Republic
- Rank: General
- Conflicts: American Revolutionary War; French Revolutionary Wars

Arthur Dillon (3 September 1750 – 13 April 1794) was a French Army officer, colonial administrator and politician who served during the American Revolutionary War and the War of the First Coalition. After serving in several political offices during the early years of the French Revolution, he was executed in Paris as a royalist during the Reign of Terror in 1794.

== Birth and origins ==
Arthur was born on 3 September 1750 at Bray Wick in Berkshire, England. He was the second son of Henry Dillon and his wife Charlotte Lee. His father was the 11th Viscount Dillon.

Arthur's mother was a daughter of George Lee, 2nd Earl of Lichfield. He had six siblings, who are listed in his father's article.

Family tree

Arthur Dillon with his two wives, his parents, and other selected relatives. (Note: This family tree is partly derived from the Dillon family tree pictured in La Tour du Pin. Also see the lists of siblings and children in the text.)

Theobald; 7th Viscount d. 1691; Jacobite | Mary; Talbot d. 1691
Henry; 8th Viscount d. 1714 | Arthur; 1670–1733; French; General | Christina; Sheldon; 1684–1757
Richard; 9th Viscount; 1688–1737 | Charles; 10th Viscount; 1701–1741 | Henry; 11th Viscount; 1705–1787 | Charlotte; Lee d. 1794
Charles; 12th Viscount; 1745–1813 | Therese; Lucy de Rothe; 1751–1782 | Arthur; Dillon; 1750–1794 | Laure de Girardin de Montgérald
Henry; Augustus; 13th Viscount; 1777–1832 | Henriette -Lucy de la Tour du Pin; 1770–1853

Legend

| XXX | Subject of the article | XXX | Viscounts; Dillon |

== Colonel ==
On 25 August 1767, at the age of 16, he became colonel of Dillon's Regiment taking over from his father who had been absentee colonel for twenty years from 1747 to 1767 after the death of his uncle Edward at Lauffeld in 1747.

== First marriage and children ==
At eighteen, Colonel Dillon married a first cousin once removed, Therese-Lucy de Rothe (1751–1782).

Arthur and Thérèse-Lucie had two children:

1. George (who died at the age of two)
2. Henriette-Lucy, or Lucie (by marriage, Henriette-Lucy, Marquise de La Tour du Pin Gouvernet), a memoiriste of the Revolutionary period and the Napoleonic era.

He was to become the grandfather of Arthur Dillon, also a military officer.

== American Revolutionary War ==
In 1778, France entered the American Revolutionary War on the American side. Dillon sailed with his regiment to the Caribbean under the command of Charles Henri Hector d'Estaing. In 1779, he and his regiment fought at the capture of Grenada against British forces under George Macartney. They landed on 2 July, and stormed the Hospital Hill which the British had chosen as the centre of their resistance. Dillon personally led one of the storming parties, his brother Henry led another. Macartney surrendered on 5 July. On 6 July 1779 a British fleet under Admiral John Byron appeared off the coast of the island and the naval engagement of the Battle of Grenada was fought. In September and October 1779, Dillon fought at the siege of Savannah where he was promoted to the rank of brigadier. He and his regiment participated in the invasion of Tobago, the capture of Sint Eustatius, and the siege of Brimstone Hill. With the victory at Brimstone Hill, Dillon was made governor of Saint Kitts. After the Treaty of Paris, he became governor of Tobago.

== Second marriage ==
His first wife having died, he married a wealthy French Creole widow from Martinique, Laure de Girardin de Montgérald, the Comtesse de la Touche, by whom he had six children, including Élisabeth Françoise 'Fanny' Dillon, later wife of Henri Gatien Bertrand. The Dillon Estate in Martinique produced sugar and later produced Dillon Rum.

== Later life, death, and timeline ==
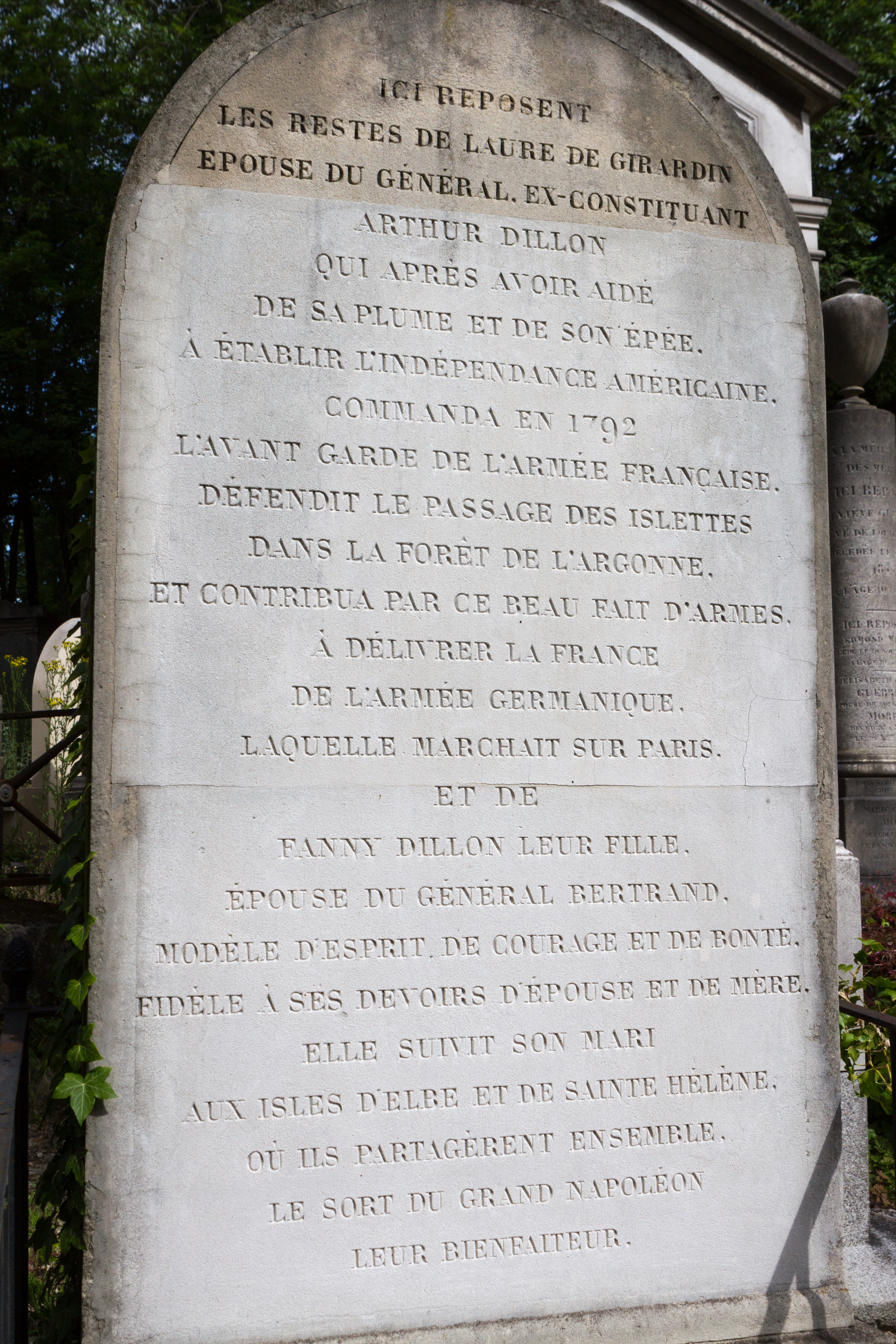
Dillon's tombstone in Père-Lachaise, where he is buried with his daughter Fanny.

He returned to Paris to represent Martinique in the Estates General of 1789 as a democratic, reformist royalist.

Dillon assumed military duties at a very difficult time for noble officers of the old army. On 29 April 1792 his cousin Théobald Dillon was lynched by his own troops after a minor skirmish. After the Battle of Valmy, when Charles Dumouriez returned to the Belgian frontier with the greater part of the army, he detached Dillon with 16,000 troops to form the rump of the Army of the Ardennes around 1 October 1792. Two weeks later Dillon was called to Paris for questioning and was ultimately arrested on 1 July 1793 despite being stoutly defended by his aide-de-camp François Séverin Marceau-Desgraviers. He was condemned for alleged participation in a prison conspiracy and executed by guillotine on 13 April 1794. In his final moments he mounted the scaffold shouting, "Vive le roi!" (Long live the king).

Timeline
| Age | Date | Event |
|---|---|---|
| 0 | 1750, 3 Sep | Born at Bray Wick in Berkshire, England. |
| 16 | 1767, 25 Aug | Became colonel and owner of Dillon's regiment. |
| 37 | 1787, 3 Nov | His father died. |
| 43 | 1794, 13 April | Died under the guillotine. |

== Works ==
- Compte-rendu au ministre de la guerre (Paris, 1792);
- Exposition des principaux événements qui ont eu le plus d'influence sur la révolution française (Paris, 1792).

== See also ==
- Distillerie Dillon

== Notes and references ==
=== Sources ===
- Jullien de Courcelles, Jean Baptiste Pierre (1822). Dictionnaire historique et biographique des généraux français [Historic and Biographic Dictionary of French Generals] (in French). Vol. Tome cinquième. Paris: chez l'auteur. OCLC 1071691485. – Coss to Exc
- La Tour du Pin, Henriette-Lucy, Marquise de (1913). Journal d'une femme de cinquante ans [Diary of a Woman in her Fifties] (in French). Vol. I (7th ed.). Paris: Librairie Chapelot. OCLC 1047408815.
- O'Callaghan, John Cornelius (1854). History of the Irish Brigades in the Service of France. New York: P. O'Shea Publisher. OCLC 1046538374.
- Phipps, Ramsay Weston (1926). The Armies of the First French Republic and the Rise of the Marshals of Napoleon I. Vol. 1 The Armée du Nord. London: Oxford University Press. OCLC 277765127.
