= 101st Regiment of Foot (Duke of York's Irish) =

- Active: 1805–1817
- Disbanded: 4 companies: 24 August 1816; 6 companies: 7 January 1817
- Country: United Kingdom
- Branch: British Army
- Type: infantry
- Engagements: Napoleonic Wars

The 101st Regiment of Foot (Duke of York's Irish) was a regiment in the British Army raised in 1805 by Honourable Henry Augustus Dillon and disbanded in 1817. It was the last unit in the British Army to be raised through a contract with an individual.

== History ==
=== Formation ===
The regiment was raised through a letter of service to Honourable Henry Augustus Dillon in 1805. Dillon had served in the Catholic Irish Brigade from 1792 to 1798. The new regiment was recruited in Ireland, and it establishment was set at 1,000 rank and file. Dillon was granted significant patronage through the letter of service, as he was permitted to nominate the officers to the unit. The officers that Dillon nominated received a promotion for joining the unit. However, gathering the officers from their previous regiments led to some delay before it was formally incorporated as part of the British Army. The regiment was added to the British Army on 25 July 1806, and the officer appointments were announced in The London Gazette on 30 August 1806. On 8 September 1806 the regiment was given the title 101st Regiment of Foot (Duke of York's Irish). It was probably the last unit in the British Army to be raised through a letter of service - a contract between the Army and individual to raise men. (Note: This approach had been common in the eighteenth century, particularly in the 1790s, but was abandoned by the Commander-in-Chief the Duke of York who thought it was frequently corrupt, damaged the status of officers, and competed with recruiting for other units.)

=== Recruitment ===
The regiment's commanding officer was William Pollock, who had seen active service in the Siege of Fort St. Philip on Minorca during the American Revolutionary War, becoming a prisoner of war after the siege. He then served in Ireland and England between 1782 and 1792 before being sent to Gibraltar and participating in the Toulon. Service in the Mediterranean followed, in Corsica and Portugal in 1797. After this, he was sent to the East Indies, before returning to Ireland on recruiting duty during 1806 in the run up to the 101st Foot being established. Pollock was assisted in the recruitment by Major George O'Malley. O'Malley commanded the unit during its deployment overseas, but wanted to serve in Europe, a wish that was granted in 1815 when he became the commander of the 2nd battalion of 44th Regiment of Foot at the Battle of Waterloo.

=== Napoleonic Wars and disbandment ===
Although the establishment of the regiment was set at 1,000 men, when it was added to the British Army it was set at 10 companies with 76 privates each. Like many single battalion British regiments, a recruiting company was added in 1809. Initially, the regiment was stationed in Ireland, then Jersey before being sent to Nova Scotia. After two years there it was sent to Jamaica, and was quartered at Spanish Town and Stony Hill. It spent the rest of the Napoleonic Wars in Jamaica until it returned to the UK in 1816 and 1817. Four companies were landed at Portsmouth on 18 June 1816 and disbanded on 24 August 1816 at Hilsea Barracks, followed by the remaining six companies which landed on 17 December 1816 and were disbanded on 7 January 1817.
