= Henriette-Lucy, Marquise de La Tour du Pin Gouvernet =

French aristocrat and memoirist (1770–1853)

Henriette-Lucy, Marquise de La Tour-du-Pin-Gouvernet
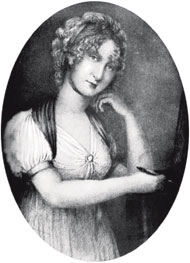
- Engraving of Henriette-Lucy
- Born: 25 February 1770; Paris, France
- Died: 2 April 1853 (aged 83); Pisa, Italy
- Other name: Lucie de la Tour du Pin
- Occupation: writer
- Spouse(s): Frédéric, Marquis de La Tour-du-Pin
- Parents: Arthur Dillon (1750–1794) (father); Thérèse-Lucy de Rothe (1751–1782) (mother)

Henriette-Lucy, Marquise de La Tour-du-Pin-Gouvernet (25 February 1770, Paris – 2 April 1853, Pisa) (also known as Lucie) was a French aristocrat famous for her posthumously published memoirs entitled Journal d'une femme de 50 ans. The memoirs are a first-hand account of her life through the Ancien Régime, the French Revolution, and the Imperial court of Napoleon, ending in March 1815 with Napoleon's return from exile on Elba. Her memoirs serve as unique testimony to much unchronicled history.

== Life ==
=== Early life ===
Henriette-Lucy Dillon was born into a prominent Irish Wild Geese Jacobite military family in France. She was daughter of Arthur Dillon, colonel-proprietor of the Dillon Regiment, and the lady-in-waiting Thérèse-Lucy de Rothe (1751–1782). Her father had been born in England, so she was often regarded in France as English. However the family, of Norman descent, was linked to the Dillons of Costello-Gallen and the lords of Drumraney in Ireland, who were granted lands in County Westmeath in the thirteenth century.

Following her mother's death and her father's subsequent posting abroad, where he remarried, Lucie lived in the household of her grandmother, Mme. de Rothe, and Arthur Richard Dillon, Archbishop of Narbonne, until marrying and joining the Court of France. She married Frédéric-Séraphin, comte de Gouvernet, later Marquis de La Tour-du-Pin, an army officer and diplomat, in 1787. He was the son of Jean-Frédéric de la Tour du Pin-Gouvernet, a French Minister of War.

Following her marriage, she was given her mother's place as an honorary or apprentice lady-in-waiting (Dame du Palais surnuméraire) to Marie Antoinette, Queen of France, and served as such every Sunday from 1787 until the outbreak of the French revolution in 1789.

=== During the revolution ===
She was present at Versailles during the assembly of the Estates General of 1789 and witnessed the Women's March on Versailles at the outbreak of the French revolution. She also witnessed the peasant uprising called the Great Fear in the countryside.

Between October 1791 and March 1792, her husband served as ambassador to the Dutch Republic in The Hague, where she joined him, returning to France only in December 1792.

During the Reign of Terror of Robespierre in 1793, many of her friends and family were executed, and she fled Paris for the family estate of Le Bouilh in the Gironde region. During the summer of that year, their estate was seized by the government, and her father-in-law was imprisoned and her husband went in hiding separate from her. With the help of Thérésa Tallien, she managed to secure a passport for herself and her husband from Jean-Lambert Tallien, a prominent member of the revolutionary French National Convention.

Directly after having secured their passports in 1794, she and her husband passed into exile for a new life on a dairy farm near Albany in Upstate New York. Although they were never officially listed as émigrés, Frédéric had been living in hiding prior to departure. She regarded this time as the happiest of her life. She vividly described the reality of owning slaves and interactions with the local Dutch families and the few remaining Native Americans of the area.

She was close to Talleyrand during his exile in the United States, and she returned to France (first freeing her four black slaves) as he did after the establishment of the Directorate in 1796. The couple left the United States because her husband wanted to resume his career in public life and shore up the family fortunes.

=== Later life ===
After the French Coup of 1799, which brought Napoleon to power, her husband was able to resume his diplomatic career. She was able to promote his career under Napoleon, who was looking for aristocrats to lend legitimacy to his power and, from 1804, his court. Her memoirs described an insider's view of many events from the Imperial court of Napoleon.

She continued to follow her husband to his various diplomatic appointments after the Bourbon Restoration. They went into effective exile again after their son Aymar became involved in the anti-Orléanist plot of Caroline Ferdinande Louise, duchesse de Berry, in 1831, in the Vendée. Aymar escaped France, but was condemned to death in his absence. The family sold its possessions in France soon after.

Following her husband's death in Lausanne, Switzerland, in 1837, she moved to Italy, where she died in Pisa.

== Legacy ==
Her memoir was written as a letter to her only surviving child after the age of fifty. It remained in the family and was not published until 1906.

She is the subject of a biography by Caroline Moorehead published in 2009.

== Bibliography ==
Catherine Montfort (Spring 2015). "Madame de La Tour du Pin: An Aristocratic Farmer in America", New Perspectives on the Eighteenth Century, 12.1: 35–47.
