= George Lee, 3rd Earl of Lichfield =

English earl (1718–1772)

George Lee
- Earl of Lichfield
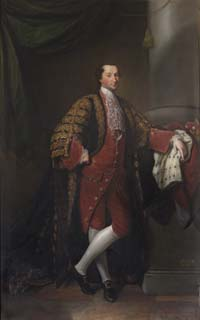
- The 3rd Earl of Lichfield by George Huddesford
- Tenure: 1743–1772
- Predecessor: George Lee, 2nd Earl of Lichfield
- Successor: Robert Lee, 4th Earl of Lichfield
- Born: 21 May 1718; London
- Died: 17 September 1772 (aged 54)
- Buried: Spelsbury
- Spouse(s): Diana Frankland
- Father: George Lee, 2nd Earl of Lichfield
- Mother: Frances Hales

George Henry Lee II, 3rd Earl of Lichfield PC (1718–1772) was a British politician and peer. He was made a Privy Councillor and Captain of the Gentlemen-at-Arms in 1762, holding both honours until death. Previously, he had served as member of parliament for Oxfordshire from 1740 until acceding to the peerage in 1743.

== Birth and origins ==
Family tree

George Lee, 3rd Earl, with wife, parents, and other selected relatives. (Note: Also see the lists of siblings in the text.)

Charles II; 1630–1685	Barbara; Villiers; 1640–1709
Edward; 1st Earl; 1663–1716	Charlotte; FitzRoy; 1664–1718
George; 2nd Earl; 1690–1743	Frances; Hales d. 1769	Robert; 4th Earl; 1706–1776	Catherine; Stonhouse; 1708–1784
George; 3rd Earl; 1718–1772	Diana; Frankland c. 1719–1779	Henry; 11th Viscount; 1705–1787	Charlotte; Lee d. 1794
Charles; 12th Viscount; 1745–1813	Henrietta- Maria; Phipps; 1757–1782

Legend

XXX	Subject of the article	XXX	Earls of Lichfield	XXX	Viscounts; Dillon

George was born on 21 May 1718 in London. He was the son of George Henry Lee I, 2nd Earl of Lichfield and his wife Frances Hales. His father was the 2nd Earl of Lichfield and a great-grandson of King Charles II through his illegitimate daughter Charlotte Fitzroy by his mistress Barbara Villiers.

George's mother was a daughter of Sir John Hales, 4th Baronet of Hackington, who had brought her up as a Catholic and was the 2nd Earl of Tenterden in the Jacobite peerage. George had two brothers and six sisters, who are listed in his father's article.

== Early life ==
From birth he was styled Viscount Quarendon as heir apparent. In the family tradition, he was educated at St John's College, Oxford. On 14 February 1732 he was made an M.A. of Oxford.

In 1740 and from 1741 to 1742, he served as member of parliament (MP) for the county of Oxford. On 15 February 1743, his father died and Viscount Quarendon became the 3rd Earl of Lichfield.

He continued his law studies at Oxford and earned his D.C.L. of Oxford on 25 August 1743. 23 years later, on 19 August of the year 1760, Lichfield received the great position of High Steward of the University of Oxford.

On 9 December 1760, he became Lord of the Bedchamber to King George III; and on 12 July 1762, Captain of the Band of Gentlemen Pensioners. He joined the Privy Council on 14 July 1762. He replaced George Huddesford as the Deputy Ranger of Hampton Court Park in July 1762. Finally, on 23 September 1762, he assumed the role of Chancellor of the University of Oxford.

From the Gentleman's Magazine, XXXIII., p. 349:

"The graceful dignity, the political condescension, the ne quid nimis ('Let there be nothing in Excess') of the Chancellor were universally admired" – 1763.

He became a vice-president of the Society of Arts; and a deputy lieutenant for Oxfordshire county on 17 October 1763.

== Marriage ==
On 16 January 1745, in Bath, Lord Lichfield married Diana or Dinah, daughter and coheir of Sir Thomas Frankland; they had no children.

== Death ==
Lord Lichfield died on 17 September 1772. The Earldom of Lichfield passed to his uncle Robert Lee.

== End of the line ==
The 3rd and 4th earls, George Henry II and Robert Lee respectively, died without issue, therefore the estate eventually reverted to the 2nd Earl's eldest surviving daughter, and sister of the 3rd Earl, Lady Charlotte Lee. In 1744 Charlotte had married the 11th Viscount Dillon. Their son Charles Dillon, 12th Viscount Dillon inherited the estate of Ditchley but not the title. Ditchley remained the home of the Viscounts Dillon until 1934.

The title would be created for a third time when Thomas Anson would be created Earl of Lichfield in the coronation honours of William IV in 1831.

Timeline
Age	Date	Event
0	1718, 21 May	Born.
9	1727, 11 Jun	Accession of King George II, succeeding King George I
24	1743, 15 Feb	Succeeded his father as 3rd Earl of Lichfield
26	1745, 16 Jan	Married Diana Frankland
42	1760, 25 Oct	Accession of King George III, succeeding King George II
54	1772, 17 Sep	Died.

== Notes and references ==
=== Sources ===
- Cokayne, George Edward (1893). Complete peerage of England, Scotland, Ireland, Great Britain and the United Kingdom, extant, extinct, or dormant. Vol. V (1st ed.). London: George Bell and Sons. OCLC 1180836840. – L to M (for Lichfield)
- Fryde, Edmund Boleslaw; Greenway, D. E.; Porter, S.; Roy, I., eds. (1986). Handbook of British Chronology. Royal Historical Society Guides and Handbooks, No. 2 (3rd ed.). London: Offices of the Royal Historical Society. ISBN 0-86193-106-8. – (for timeline)
- Ruvigny, Melville Henry, Marquis de (1904). Jacobite Peerage Baronetage Knightage and Grants of Honour. Edinburgh: T C & E C Jack. OCLC 655825906.
- Thorne, Roland (2004). "Lee, George Henry, third earl of Lichfield (1718–1772)". In Matthew, Colin; Harrison, Brian (eds.). Oxford Dictionary of National Biography. Vol. 35. New York: Oxford University Press. pp. 69–71. ISBN 0-19-861383-0.

Academic offices
Preceded by Earl of Westmorland	Chancellor of the University of Oxford; 1762–1772	Succeeded by Lord North
Political offices
Preceded by The Lord Berkeley of Stratton	Captain of the Gentlemen Pensioners; 1762–1772	Succeeded by The Lord Edgcumbe
Peerage of England
Preceded by George Lee	Earl of Lichfield; 1743–1772	Succeeded by Robert Lee
