= Lee baronets =

Extinct baronetcy in the Baronetage of the United Kingdom

There have been four baronetcies created for people with the surname Lee, all extinct.

== Lee baronets, of Quarendon, Buckinghamshire (1611–1776) ==
This branch of the family owned Ditchley House, current home of the Ditchley Foundation. The last male heir of the Lees of Quarendon, was the 4th Earl of Lichfield Robert Lee, a grandson of Charles II. When he died childless in 1776, the title became extinct.

- Sir Henry Lee, 1st Bt., of Quarendon, later of Ditchley (died by 1632). Heir, cousin and namesake of Master of the Royal Armouries Sir Henry Lee. His widow Eleanor Wortley (daughter of Sir Richard Wortley of Wortley) married a Parliamentarian in 1633 – Edward Radclyffe, 6th Earl of Sussex – after inveighing against her son's marriage to a St. John. Her remarriage removed much of the Lee family income during her lifetime.
- Sir Francis Henry Lee, 2nd Bt., of Quarendon (1616–1639, died of smallpox aged 23). He married October 1632 Hon. Anne St. John (b. 5 November 1614; buried 18 March 1696, aged 82) later Countess of Rochester, as her first husband, and had issue 2 sons (and one daughter who died young in 1640) by her.
- Sir Henry Lee, 3rd Bt. (born ca. 1633; died 1659 of smallpox like his father); he married ca. 1655 Ann Danvers (d. 1659 in childbirth), daughter of Sir John Danvers, a prominent Puritan neighbor at Cornbury and Chelsea and regicide of King Charles I. They had two daughters who were co-heiresses –
  - Eleanora, or Ellen (died 31 May 1691 or 1692), who married 1 February 1672 to Lord Norreys who became Earl of Abingdon in 1682, and
  - Anne, or Nan (c. 1659 – 29 October 1685), later first wife since 16 September 1673 of Thomas Wharton, 1st Marquess of Wharton; she had no issue, and left her husband her money.
- Sir Francis Henry Lee, 4th Bt, of Quarendon, later of Ditchley (died 1667), who married Lady Elizabeth Pope, daughter of Thomas Pope, 2nd Earl of Downe (later third wife of Robert Bertie, 3rd Earl of Lindsey, who left two sons Edward Henry Lee and Francis (who passes into obscurity after a bad marriage).
- Sir Edward Lee 5th Bart of Quarendon. King Charles II created him 2nd Baron Spilsbury, Viscount Quarendon and Earl of Litchfield in anticipation of his marriage (1677) to the king's natural daughter Lady Charlotte Fitzroy. The marriage was arranged circa 1674 by his formidable grandmother Anne St. John, Countess of Rochester. They had several children, of whom only a few survived to adulthood. Lichfield replaced his popular cousin by marriage Lord Abingdon as Lord Lieutenant of Oxfordshire briefly in the years 1687–1689 during the reign of James II.
- George Lee, 2nd Earl of Lichfield, 6th Baronet (12 March 1690 –15 February 1743) Grandfather of Charles Dillon, 12th Viscount Dillon
- George Lee, 3rd Earl of Lichfield, 7th Baronet (21 May 1718 – 19 September 1772) died without issue; he was succeeded by his next surviving uncle.
- Robert Lee, 4th Earl of Lichfield, 8th and last Baronet (3 July 1706 – 3 November 1776) died without issue, leading to the extinction of the earldom and baronetcy. Grandson of Charles II. Ditchley house passed to his niece and then to her son Charles Dillon, 12th Viscount Dillon

== Lee baronets, of Langley (1620–1666) ==
The baronetcy was created on 3 May 1620 for Humphry Lee.

- Sir Humphry Lee, 1st Baronet (c. 1569–1631)
- Sir Richard Lee, 2nd Baronet (c. 1600–1660)

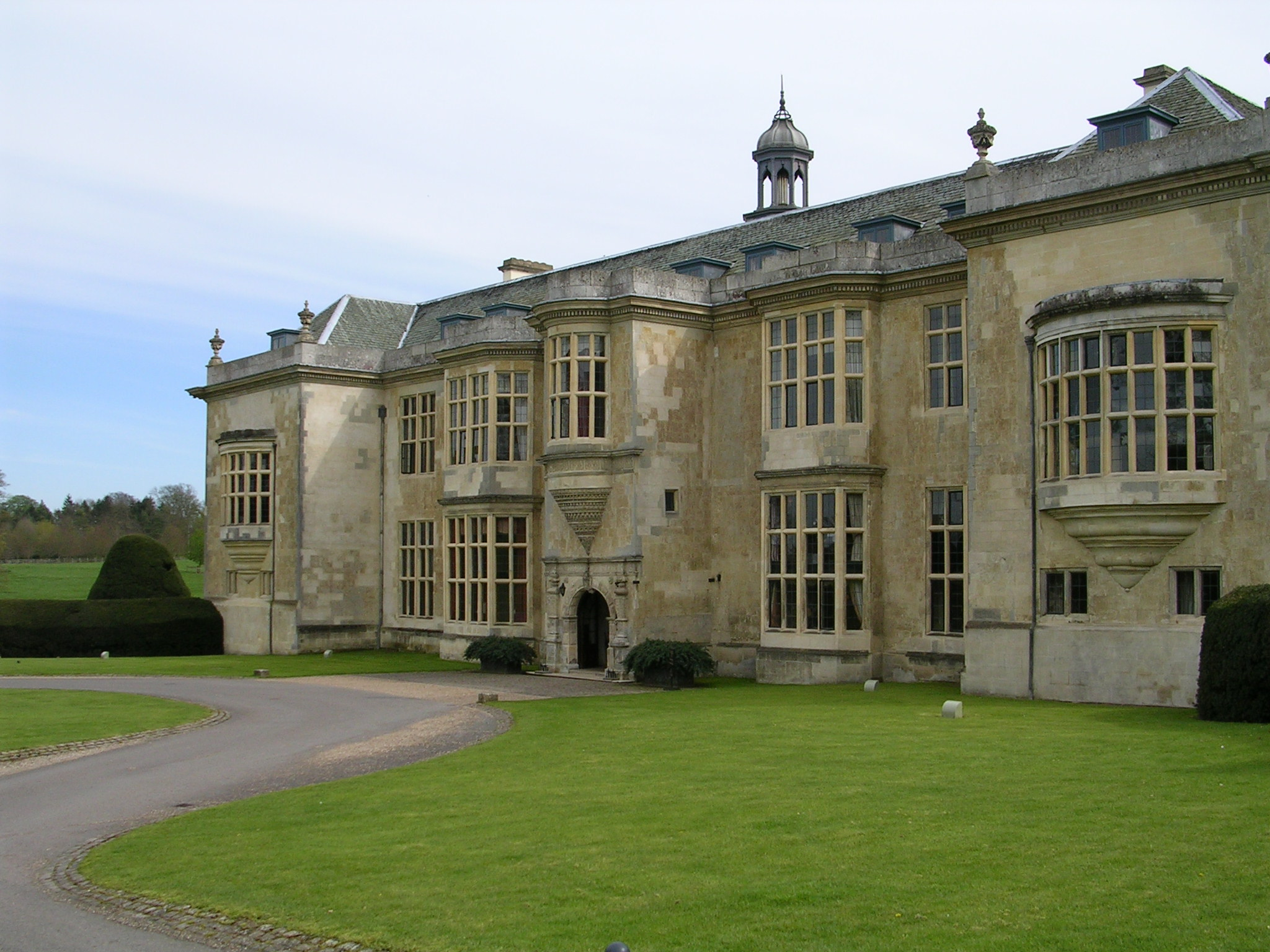
Hartwell House

== Lee baronets, of Hartwell (1660–1827) ==
The baronetcy was created on 16 August 1660 for Thomas Lee.

- Sir Thomas Lee, 1st Baronet (1635–1691)
- Sir Thomas Lee, 2nd Baronet (1660–1702)
- Sir Thomas Lee, 3rd Baronet (1687–1749)
- Sir William Lee, 4th Baronet (1726–1799)
- Sir William Lee, 5th Baronet (1764–1801)
- Sir George Lee, 6th Baronet (1767–1827)

== Lee baronets, of Lukyns (1941–1967) ==
The Lee Baronetcy, of Lukyns in the County of Surrey was created in the Baronetage of the United Kingdom on 30 January 1941 for Kenneth Lee. With his death in 1967, the baronetcy became extinct.

- Sir Kenneth Lee, 1st Baronet (1879–1967)

Baronetage of England
Preceded by Maynard baronets	Lee baronets 29 June 1611	Succeeded by Napier baronets
