= Earl of Lichfield =

Earldom in the Peerage of the United Kingdom

Earldom of Lichfield
- Arms of Anson: Argent, three bends engrailed and in the sinister chief point a crescent gules
- Creation date: 15 September 1831
- Creation: Third
- Created by: King William IV
- Peerage: Peerage of the United Kingdom
- First holder: Thomas Anson, 1st Earl of Lichfield
- Present holder: Thomas Anson, 6th Earl of Lichfield
- Heir apparent: Thomas Anson, Viscount Anson
- Subsidiary titles: Viscount Anson; Baron Soberton
- Status: Extant
- Motto: NIL DESPERANDUM (Despair of nothing)

Quartered arms borne by Anson, Earl of Lichfield: Quarterly of 4: 1: Argent, three bends engrailed and in the sinister chief point a crescent gules (Anson); 2: Ermine, three cats-a-mountain passant guardant in pale sable (Adams); 3: Azure, three salmon naiant in pale per pale or and argent (Sambrooke); 4: Sable, a bend or between three spearheads argent (Carrier). Crests: 1: Out of a ducal coronet or, a spearhead proper; 2: A Greyhound's head erased ermines gorged with a collar double gemelle or. Supporters: dexter: A sea horse proper gorged with a collar double gemelle or; sinister: A lion guardant proper gorged with a collar double gemelle or

Earl of Lichfield is a title that has been created three times, twice in the Peerage of England (1645 and 1674) and once in the Peerage of the United Kingdom (1831). The third creation is extant and is held by a member of the Anson family.

== History ==
=== Earls of Lichfield, first creation (1645) ===
The first creation, in the Peerage of England, was in December 1645 by King Charles I for his 4th cousin Charles Stewart (1639–1672), whose youngest uncle Lord Bernard Stewart (1623-26 September 1645) (youngest son of Esmé Stewart, 3rd Duke of Lennox), had been due to be created Earl of Lichfield by Charles I for his actions at the battles of Newbury and Naseby but died aged 22 in the Battle of Rowton Heath before the creation could be implemented. Charles Stewart, the son of Bernard's elder brother George Stewart, 9th Seigneur d'Aubigny (who had been killed at the Battle of Edgehill in 1642), was in his place created Earl of Lichfield in December 1645. In 1660 the 1st Earl succeeded his infant first cousin, Esmé Stuart, 2nd Duke of Richmond, 5th Duke of Lennox (1649–1660) in his titles and thus became also 3rd Duke of Richmond and 6th Duke of Lennox.

In that same year he was created Hereditary Great Chamberlain of Scotland, Hereditary Great Admiral of Scotland, and Lord-Lieutenant of Dorset. On 15 April 1661, following the Restoration of the Monarchy, he was invested by King Charles II with the Order of the Garter. He married three times, but produced no surviving male issue, being the last in the male line of Stewart of Aubigny, much beloved cousins of the Stewart monarchs. One of his wives was Frances Teresa Stuart, the celebrated beauty and alleged former mistress of King Charles II.

In disgrace with the king, Charles was sent into exile as ambassador to Denmark, where he drowned on 12 December 1672. All of the English and Scottish titles that descended in the male line became extinct. The titles of Richmond and Lennox (which had merged into the crown in 1485 and 1586 respectively) and Aubigny, were re-granted by King Charles II (with the cooperation of the French King) to his last mistress Louise de Kérouaille, 1st Duchesse d'Aubigny, and her illegitimate issue by him, namely Charles Lennox, 1st Duke of Richmond, 1st Duke of Lennox, whose descendants survive today at Goodwood House in Sussex.

=== Earls of Lichfield, second creation (1674) ===
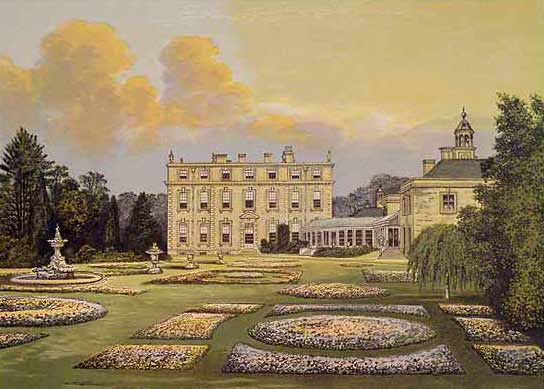
Ditchley House, the seat of the Lee family and current home of the Ditchley Foundation

The second creation, in the Peerage of England, came in 1674 when King Charles II bestowed the titles of Baron Spelsbury, Viscount Quarendon and Earl of Lichfield upon Sir Edward Lee, 5th Baronet, of Quarendon (1663–1716) in anticipation of his marriage to the king's illegitimate daughter Charlotte Fitzroy, whose mother was Barbara Villiers. The wedding took place in 1677. The Lee baronetcy, of Quarendon in Buckinghamshire, had been created in the Baronetage of England in 1611 for Henry Lee. He was the cousin and heir of Henry Lee of Ditchley.

The 1st Earl of Lichfield from the Lee family was succeeded by his third but eldest surviving son, George Henry Lee, who became the 2nd Earl and 6th Baronet. He constructed the stately home of Ditchley in Oxfordshire. On his death the titles passed to his son George Henry Lee, the 3rd Earl. He represented Oxfordshire in the House of Commons and served as Captain of the Honourable Band of Gentlemen Pensioners from 1762 to 1772. He died childless and was succeeded by his grand-uncle Robert, the 4th Earl. He was also childless. On his death in 1776 all his titles became extinct.

=== Country seat ===
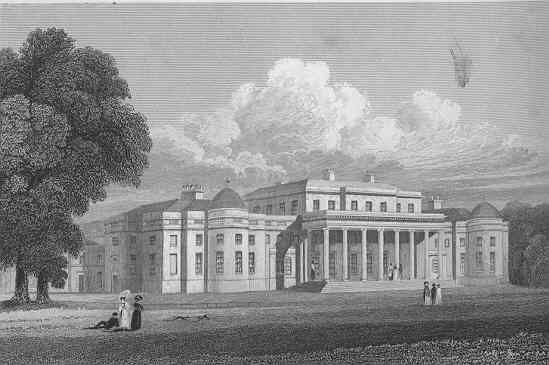
Shugborough Hall, the seat of the Anson family

The family seat of the Anson earls of Lichfield was Shugborough Hall, Staffordshire, about fifteen miles from the city of Lichfield. Admiral Anson, the 1st Earl of Lichfield and others are buried at St Michael and All Angels Church in Colwich, a short distance from Shugborough Hall. The 2nd, 3rd and 4th Earl and other Ansons of Shugborough after 1854 were buried in the churchyard of St Stephen's Church in Great Haywood.

Following his father's death in 1960, Patrick Anson, 5th Earl of Lichfield, decided to give Shugborough Hall up to the National Trust in lieu of death duties, an arrangement finalized in 1966. For his own burial, he chose the Anson vault at Colwich and was buried there in 2005.

=== Earls of Lichfield, third creation (1831) ===
The third creation, in the Peerage of the United Kingdom, came in William IV's coronation honours of 1831 in favour of Thomas Anson, 2nd Viscount Anson (1795–1854), a landowner and Whig politician from the Anson family who served as Master of the Buckhounds from 1830 to 1834 and as Postmaster General from 1835 to 1841.

The 1st Earl was the eldest son of Thomas Anson, 1st Viscount Anson, who on 17 February 1806 had been created Baron Soberton, of Soberton in the County of Southampton, and Viscount Anson, of Shugborough and Orgreave in the County of Stafford, both in the Peerage of the United Kingdom. Also in 1831, the 1st Earl's cousin William Anson was made a baronet (see Anson Baronets). The earldom of Lichfield continued to descend within the Anson family from father to son until the death of the 4th Earl, in 1960. He was succeeded by his grandson, the 5th Earl, the only son of Lieutenant-Colonel Thomas William Arnold Anson, Viscount Anson (1913–1958), eldest son of the 4th Earl. Known professionally as Patrick Lichfield, he was a successful photographer.

As of 2017 the titles are held by the 6th Earl, only son of the 5th Earl and Lady Leonora Grosvenor, daughter of the 5th Duke of Westminster. He succeeded as the 6th Earl of Lichfield upon his father's death on 11 November 2005. The 6th Earl married in December 2009 Lady Henrietta Conyngham, daughter of Henry Conyngham, 8th Marquess Conyngham.

== List of title holders ==
=== Earls of Lichfield (1645) ===
- Charles Stewart (1639–1672), created 1st Earl of Lichfield in 1645

=== Earls of Lichfield (1674) ===
Other titles: Baronet, of Quarendon (1611), Baron Spelsbury (1674), Viscount Quarendon (1674)

- Sir Edward Henry Lee, 5th Baronet (1663–1716), created 1st Earl of Lichfield in 1674
  - Charles Lee, Viscount Quarendon (1680–1680)
  - Edward Henry Lee, Viscount Quarendon (1681–1713)
- Sir George Henry Lee, 6th Baronet, 2nd Earl of Lichfield (1690–1742)
- Sir George Henry Lee, 7th Baronet, 3rd Earl of Lichfield (1718–1772)
- Sir Robert Lee, 8th Baronet, 4th Earl of Lichfield (1706–1776)

=== Earls of Lichfield (1831) ===
Other titles: Baron Soberton (1806), Viscount Anson (1806)

- Thomas William Anson, 2nd Viscount Anson (1795–1854), created 1st Earl of Lichfield in 1831
- Thomas George Anson, 2nd Earl of Lichfield (1825–1892)
- Thomas Francis Anson, 3rd Earl of Lichfield (1856–1918)
- Thomas Edward Anson, 4th Earl of Lichfield (1883–1960)
  - Thomas William Arnold Anson, Viscount Anson (1913–1958), married and divorced Anne Bowes-Lyon, a first cousin of Queen Elizabeth II.
- Thomas Patrick John Anson, 5th Earl of Lichfield (1939–2005), married and divorced Lady Leonora Grosvenor, daughter of the 5th Duke of Westminster
- Thomas William Robert Hugh Anson, 6th Earl of Lichfield (b. 1978)

== Present peer ==
Thomas William Robert Hugh Anson, 6th Earl of Lichfield (born 19 July 1978) is the son of the 5th Earl and his wife Lady Leonora Mary Grosvenor. Styled as Viscount Anson from birth, on 11 November 2005 he succeeded his father as Earl of Lichfield (UK, 1831), Viscount Anson, of Shugborough (UK, 1806), and Baron Soberton (UK, 1806).

In December 2009, at Chelsea Register Office, Chelsea, London, he married Lady Henrietta Conyngham, daughter of Henry Conyngham, 8th Marquess Conyngham. They have two children, Thomas Ossian Patrick Wolfe Anson, Viscount Anson (born 2011), and the Hon. Finnian Anson (born 2014).

== See also ==
- Duke of Richmond
- Duke of Lennox
- Lee baronets, of Quarendon
- Anson family
- Baron Anson
- Anson Baronets
