= George Lee, 2nd Earl of Lichfield =

English earl (1690–1743)

George Lee
- Earl of Lichfield
- Reign: 1716–1742
- Predecessor: Edward, 1st Earl of Lichfield
- Successor: George, 3rd Earl of Lichfield
- Born: 12 March 1690
- Died: 15 February 1743 aged 52
- Spouse: Frances Hales
- Issue Detail: George Henry & others
- Father: Edward, 1st Earl of Lichfield
- Mother: Charlotte Fitzroy

George Henry Lee I, 2nd Earl of Lichfield (1690–1743) was a younger son of Edward Henry Lee, 1st Earl of Lichfield and his wife Charlotte Fitzroy, an illegitimate daughter of Charles II by his mistress, the celebrated courtesan Barbara Villiers. On 14 July 1716 George Henry Lee succeeded his father as the 2nd Earl of Lichfield.

== Birth and origins ==
George was born on 12 March 1690 in St. James Park, London. He was one of the ten children and the fourth of the sons of Edward Henry Lee and his wife Charlotte Fitzroy. His father was created Viscount Quarendon and Earl of Lichfield just before his marriage. George's mother was a natural daughter of Charles II and Barbara Villiers.

Family tree

George Lee, 2nd Earl, with wife, parents, and other selected relatives.

Charles II; 1630–1685	Barbara; Villiers; 1640–1709
Edward; 1st Earl; 1663–1716	Charlotte; FitzRoy; 1664–1718
George; 2nd Earl; 1690–1742	Frances; Hales d. 1769	Robert; 4th Earl; 1706–1776	Catherine; Stonhouse; 1708–1784
George; 3rd Earl; 1718–1772	Diana; Frankland c. 1719–1779	Henry; 11th Viscount; 1705–1787	Charlotte; Lee d. 1794
Charles; 12th Viscount; 1745–1813	Henrietta- Maria; Phipps; 1757–1782

Legend

XXX	George; Lee	XXX	Earls of Lichfield	XXX	Viscounts; Dillon

Also see the lists of siblings and children in the text.

George listed among his brothers
He appears below among his brothers as the fourth son:
1. Edward Henry (1681–1713), became the colonel of the Royal Regiment of Guards, predeceased his father and never married;
2. James (died 1711), became a captain in the Royal Navy and married Sarah, daughter of John Bagshaw, but the marriage stayed childless and he predeceased his father;
3. Charles (died 1708), predeceased his father and never married;
4. George Henry (died 1742), the subject of this article;
5. Fitzroy Henry Lee (1699–1750), became a Vice-Admiral in the Royal Navy; and
6. Robert Lee (1706–1776), became the 4th and last Earl.

George's sisters
1. Charlotte (1678–1721), married Benedict Calvert, 4th Baron Baltimore;
2. Anne, died young;
3. Elizabeth, married first Colonel Lee and secondly the Reverend Dr. Edward Young; and
4. Barbara, married Sir Charles, 2nd Baronet Browne of Kiddington.

== Early life ==
George became heir apparent and was given the corresponding courtesy title of Viscount Quarendon when his eldest brother, Edward Henry, died in 1713. On 14 July 1716 his father died and he succeeded as the 2nd Earl of Lichfield.

== Marriage and children ==
In about 1717 Lord Lichfield, as he was now, married Frances Hales (died 3 February 1769), daughter of Sir John Hales, 4th Baronet of Hackington, of Woodchurch in Kent.

George and Frances had three sons:

1. George Henry (1718–1772), his successor
2. Edward Henry (died 1742)
3. Charles Henry (died 1740)

—and five daughters:

1. Charlotte, married to Henry Dillon, 11th Viscount Dillon. They were the parents of Charles Dillon, 12th Viscount Dillon and Arthur Dillon (1750–1794); grandparents of George Stafford-Jerningham, 8th Baron Stafford; great-grandparents of Sir Henry Paston-Bedingfeld, 6th Baronet; and great-great-grandparents of William Petre, 12th Baron Petre and Henry Petre.
2. Mary, married to Cosmas Neville, Esquire
3. Frances, married Henry Hyde, 5th Baron Hyde
4. Henrietta or Harriet, married to John Bellew, 4th Baron Bellew of Duleek
5. Anne, married to Hugh Clifford, 4th Baron Clifford of Chudleigh. They were the paternal grandparents of Hugh Clifford, 7th Baron Clifford of Chudleigh.

== Later life, death, and succession ==
In 1719 Lord Lichfield was one of main subscribers in the Royal Academy of Music (1719), a corporation that produced baroque opera on stage. In 1722 he built the Oxfordshire Stately home, Ditchley, designed by James Gibbs. Lichfield was educated at St John's College, Oxford and created a D.C.L. of Oxford on 19 August 1732. On 7 August 1739 he was made Custos Brevium in the Court of Common Pleas, as well as a governor of the Foundling Hospital.

Lichfield died on 15 February 1743 and was buried in Spelsbury. He was succeeded by his son and namesake, George Henry Lee II.

Timeline
Age	Date	Event
0	1690, 12 Mar	Born, in London.
11	1702, 8 Mar	Accession of Queen Anne, succeeding King William III
23	1713	Became heir apparent on his brother's death and gained the courtesy title of Viscount Quarendon.
24	1714, 1 Aug	Accession of King George I, succeeding Queen Anne
26	1716, 14 Jul	Succeeded his father as the 2nd Earl of Lichfield.
26–27	1717, about	Married Frances Hales.
37	1727, 11 Jun	Accession of King George II, succeeding King George I
52	1743, 15 Feb	Died and was buried at Spelsbury.

== See also ==
- Lee Baronets of Quarendon, Buckinghamshire, 1611–1776.

== Bibliography ==
- Burke, John; Burke, John Bernard (1838). A Genealogical and Heraldic History of the Extinct and Dormant Baronetcies of England. London: Scott, Webster and Geary. OCLC 810767722.
- Burke, Bernard (1883). A Genealogical History of the Dormant, Abeyant, Forfeited and Extinct Peerages of the British Empire (New ed.). London: Harrison. OCLC 499232768.
- Cokayne, George Edward (1893). Complete peerage of England, Scotland, Ireland, Great Britain and the United Kingdom, extant, extinct, or dormant. Vol. V (1st ed.). London: George Bell and Sons. OCLC 1180836840. – L to M (for Lichfield)
- Fryde, Edmund Boleslaw; Greenway, D. E.; Porter, S.; Roy, I., eds. (1986). Handbook of British Chronology. Royal Historical Society Guides and Handbooks, No. 2 (3rd ed.). London: Offices of the Royal Historical Society. ISBN 0-86193-106-8. – (for timeline)
- Murdoch, Tessa (ed.), Noble Households: Eighteenth-Century Inventories of Great English Houses (Cambridge, John Adamson, 2006) ISBN 978-0-9524322-5-8 OCLC 78044620. For an inventory of the earl's furniture at Ditchley, Oxfordshire, following his death in 1743, see pp. 145–52.

Peerage of England
Preceded by Edward Lee	Earl of Lichfield; 1716–1742	Succeeded by George Lee
