= Frances Lee, Countess of Lichfield =

English aristocrat and philanthropist

Frances Lee
- Countess of Lichfield
- Born: Frances Hales
- Died: 3 February 1769
- Spouse: George Lee, 2nd Earl of Lichfield
- Issue: Lady Charlotte Lee; Edward Henry Lee; Charles Henry Lee; Lady Mary Lee; George Henry Lee; Lady Frances Lee; Frances Lee; Lady Henrietta Lee; Lady Anne Lee

Frances Lee, Countess of Lichfield (née Hales, 1697 – 3 February 1769) was an English aristocrat and philanthropist.

She was the daughter of Sir John Hales, 4th Bt, and grew up at Hales Place near Canterbury, Kent.

She married George Lee, 2nd Earl of Lichfield, at a private ceremony before May 1718.

They had nine children together:

1. Lady Charlotte Lee (d. 11 Jun 1794), who married Henry Dillon, 11th Viscount Dillon
2. Edward Henry Lee (d. 1742)
3. Charles Henry Lee (d. 1740)
4. Lady Mary Lee
5. George Henry Lee, 3rd Earl of Lichfield (21 May 1718 – 19 Sep 1772)
6. Lady Frances Lee (21 Jan 1721 – 29 Jan 1761), who is thought to have married Henry Hyde, Viscount Cornbury
7. Frances Lee (Nov 1721 - 1723), who died in infancy
8. Lady Henrietta Lee (1726 - 30 Apr 1752), who married John Bellew, 4th Baron Bellew of Duleek
9. Lady Anne Lee (c. 1731 - 9 Dec 1802), who married Hugh Clifford, 4th Baron Clifford of Chudleigh, and had children

She was one of the signatories to Thomas Coram's petition to King George II to establish the Foundling Hospital, which she signed on 27 April 1730.

She died on 3 February 1769.
