= Robert Lee, 4th Earl of Lichfield =

English earl (1706–1776)

Robert Lee
- Earl of Lichfield
- Tenure: 1772–1776
- Predecessor: George Lee, 3rd Earl of Lichfield
- Born: 3 July 1706
- Died: 4 November 1776 (aged 70)
- Spouse: Catherine Stonhouse
- Father: Edward Henry Lee, 1st Earl of Lichfield
- Mother: Charlotte FitzRoy

Robert Lee, 4th Earl of Lichfield (1706–1776) was an English politician and peer, the last of the Earls of Lichfield.

== Birth and origins ==
Robert was born on 3 July 1706 in St. James Street, Westminster, London. He was the last son of 18 known children of Edward Henry Lee and his wife Charlotte FitzRoy. His father was created the 1st Earl of Lichfield just before his marriage. Robert's mother was a natural daughter of Charles II and Barbara Villiers.

Family tree

Robert Lee with wife, parents, and other selected relatives. (Note: Also see the lists of siblings and children in the text.)

Charles II; 1630–1685 | Barbara; Villiers; 1640–1709
Edward; 1st Earl; 1663–1716 | Charlotte; FitzRoy; 1664–1718
George; 2nd Earl; 1690–1742 | Frances; Hales d. 1769 | Robert; 4th Earl; 1706–1776 | Catherine; Stonhouse; 1708–1784
George; 3rd Earl; 1718–1772 | Diana; Frankland c. 1719–1779 | Henry; 11th Viscount; 1705–1787 | Charlotte; Lee d. 1794
Henrietta- Maria; Phipps; 1757–1782 | Charles; 12th Viscount; 1745–1813 | Marie; Rogier d. 1833

Legend

| XXX | Subject of the article | XXX | Earls of Lichfield | XXX | Viscounts; Dillon |

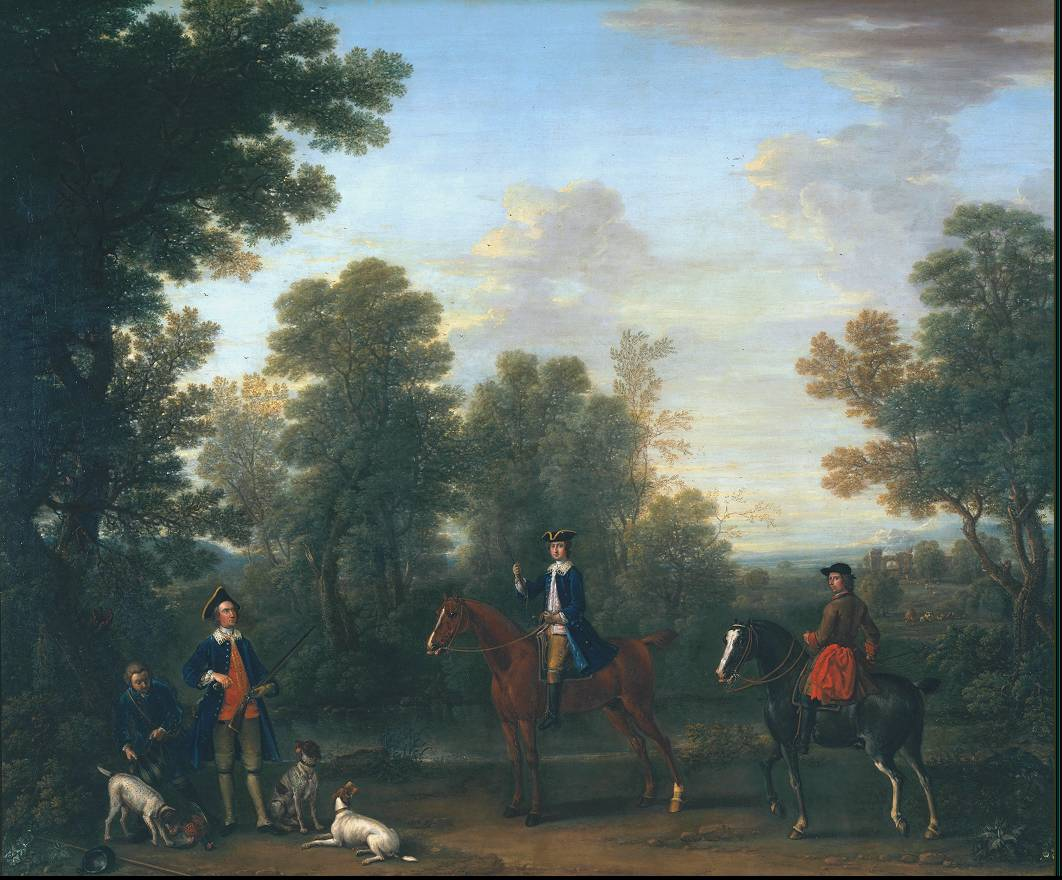
Hunting scene by John Wootton (1744), with Robert Lee on the left holding the gun, George Lee, 3rd Earl of Lichfield, his nephew, mounted in the centre

== Early life ==
Lee was MP for Oxford from 1754 to 1768, and considered a Tory. Lee held the sinecure position of Custos Brevium of the Court of Common Pleas, in the royal gift.

== Marriage ==
On 29 May 1745, at St Paul's Cathedral, London, Lee married Catherine Stonhouse (1708–1784), daughter of Sir John Stonhouse, 3rd Baronet, of Radley, Berkshire. The marriage was childless.

== 4th Earl ==
On 17 September 1772, at the age of 66, Lee became the 4th Earl of Lichfield when the 3rd Earl, his nephew, died childless.

== Death, succession, and timeline ==
Lord Lichfield, as he now was, died childless on 4 November 1776, falling off his horse while hunting near Ditchley. He was buried in the All Saints church in Spelsbury in an elaborate marble monument by William Tyler (architect). He was the last Earl of this, the second, creation of the title. The earldom became extinct, but the estate went to his niece Lady Charlotte Lee, eldest surviving daughter of his brother, George Lee, 2nd Earl of Lichfield. In 1744 Charlotte had married Viscount Dillon. Their son Charles Dillon, 12th Viscount Dillon inherited the estate at his mother's death in 1794. This included the house at Ditchley, which remained the home of the Viscounts Dillon until 1934.

Timeline
| Age | Date | Event |
|---|---|---|
| 0 | 1706, 3 Jul | Born, in London |
| 8 | 1714, 1 Aug | Accession of King George I, succeeding Queen Anne |
| 20 | 1727, 11 Jun | Accession of King George II, succeeding King George I |
| 38 | 1745, 29 May | Married Catherine Stonhouse at St. Paul's Cathedral in London |
| 54 | 1760, 25 Oct | Accession of King George III, succeeding King George II |
| 66 | 1772, 17 Sep | Succeeded his nephew as 4th Earl of Lichfield |
| 70 | 1776, 4 Nov | Died at Ditchley |

== Notes and references ==
=== Sources ===
- Betham, Rev. William (1801). The Baronetage of England: Or The History of the English Baronets, and Such Baronets of Scotland, as are of English Families; with Genealogical Tables, and Engravings of Their Coats of Arms. Vol. I. London: William Miller. OCLC 11327542.
- Burke, John; Burke, John Bernard (1838). A Genealogical and Heraldic History of the Extinct and Dormant Baronetcies of England. London: Scott, Webster and Geary. OCLC 810767722.
- Burke, Bernard (1866). A Genealogical History of the Dormant, Abeyant, Forfeited and Extinct Peerages of the British Empire (New ed.). London: Harrison. OCLC 11501348.
- Burke, Bernard; Burke, Ashworth Peter (1915). A Genealogical and Heraldic History of the Peerage and Baronetage, the Privy Council, Knightage and Companionage (77th ed.). London: Harrison. OCLC 1155471554.
- Cokayne, George Edward (1893). Complete peerage of England, Scotland, Ireland, Great Britain and the United Kingdom, extant, extinct, or dormant. Vol. V (1st ed.). London: George Bell and Sons. OCLC 1180836840. – L to M (for Lichfield)
- Fryde, Edmund Boleslaw; Greenway, D. E.; Porter, S.; Roy, I., eds. (1986). Handbook of British Chronology. Royal Historical Society Guides and Handbooks, No. 2 (3rd ed.). London: Offices of the Royal Historical Society. ISBN 0-86193-106-8. – (for timeline)

Parliament of Great Britain
| Preceded by The Viscount Wenman; Thomas Rowney | Member of Parliament for Oxford; 1754–1768; With: Thomas Rowney to 1759; Sir Thomas Stapleton, Bt 1759–1768 | Succeeded by George Nares; Hon. William Harcourt |
Peerage of England
| Preceded by George Lee | Earl of Lichfield; 1772–1776 | Extinct |
