= Edward Lee, 1st Earl of Lichfield =

English peer (1663–1716)

The Right Honourable The Earl of Lichfield
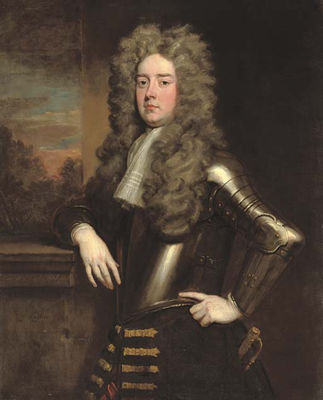
- Portrait by Godfrey Kneller

Lord Lieutenant of Oxfordshire
- In office 1687–1689
- Preceded by: The Earl of Abingdon
- Succeeded by: The Earl of Abingdon

Personal details
- Born: 4 February 1663
- Died: 14 July 1716 (aged 53)
- Spouse: Lady Charlotte Fitzroy (m. 1677)
- Children: Charlotte Lee, Lady Baltimore; Charles Lee, Viscount Quarendon; Edward Lee, Viscount Quarendon; Captain Hon. James Lee; Hon. Francis Lee; Lady Anne Morgan; Hon. Charles Lee; George Lee, 2nd Earl of Lichfield; Hon. Francis Henry Fitzroy Lee; Lady Elizabeth Young; Barbara Browne, Lady Browne; Lady Mary Lee; Hon. Fitzroy Lee; Hon. FitzRoy Henry Lee; Hon. William Lee; Hon. Thomas Lee; Hon. John Lee; Robert Lee, 4th Earl of Lichfield

Edward Henry Lee, 1st Earl of Lichfield (4 February 1663 – 14 July 1716) was an English peer, the son of a baronet, who at 14 years of age married one of the illegitimate daughters of King Charles II, Charlotte Lee, prior to which he was made Earl of Lichfield. They had a large family; Lady Lichfield bore him 18 children. He was a staunch Tory and followed James II to Rochester, Kent after the king's escape from Whitehall in December 1688. His subsidiary titles were Viscount Quarendon and Baron Spelsbury.

== Biography ==
=== Early life ===
Edward Lee was the son of Sir Francis Henry Lee, 4th Baronet of Quarendon and his wife Lady Elizabeth Pope, daughter of Thomas Pope, 2nd Earl of Downe, who was later third wife of Robert Bertie, 3rd Earl of Lindsey. After his mothers remarriage, Edward gained two half-siblings, Charles and Elizabeth Bertie. His great grandfather, Henry Lee, was the cousin and heir of Henry Lee of Ditchley. His father's half-brother was the libertine-poet the Earl of Rochester who took a great interest in his young relative and helped to bring about his betrothal to the daughter of the king.

In his youth, he was considered to be kind, charming, strong, intelligent as well as arrogant because of his position in the peerage and to his status as a royal son-in-law to the king.

=== Marriage ===
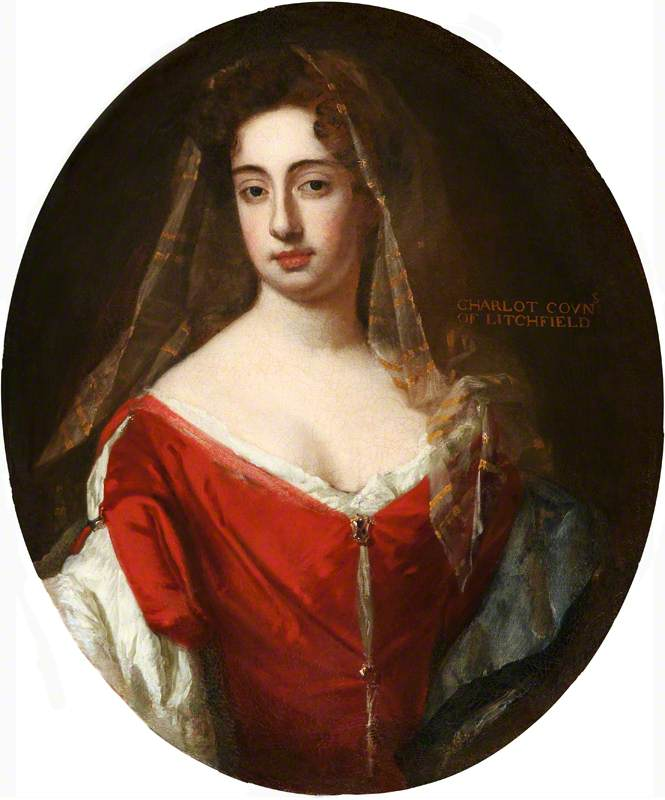
King Charles II contracted his daughter, Charlotte Lee (pictured), to Edward Lee when she was ten and he was eleven, and the two married at the ages of thirteen and fourteen in 1677

Lee was created Earl of Lichfield in 1674 at the age of eleven, a result of his betrothal to the daughter of King Charles II. The Lady Charlotte Fitzroy was the fourth of six children born to the king's mistress, the Duchess of Cleveland. Sweet-natured and strikingly beautiful, Charlotte was adored by her father the king. She was contracted at the age of nine to Lee, who was sixteen months older than his bride-to-be. Nearly three years later, having reached puberty, the thirteen- and fourteen-year-olds were married on 6 February 1677.

His royal father in law funded a townhouse in London for Lichfield and his wife, to be built by Sir Christopher Wren in 1677, named Lichfield House, it was adjoined by another home which is today known as 10 Downing Street.)

In 1681, his cousin, the only son of the Earl of Rochester (who had died in 1680), passed away and subsequently Lee inherited Adderbury Manor from him.

=== Public service ===
From 1687 to 1689, Lichfield served as Lord Lieutenant of Oxfordshire. He commanded Lichfield's Regiment, an infantry regiment in the English Army until his dismissal for Jacobite sympathies following the Glorious Revolution and for refusing to swearing an oath of loyalty to Queen Anne and William III. He later played prominent part in the Williamite War in Ireland (1689–1691), going through a succession of new Colonels including Henry Wharton and Richard Brewer.

=== Family and children ===
Lady Lichfield bore him at least eighteen children:

- Charlotte Lee, Lady Baltimore (13 March 1678 (Old Style) – 22 January 1721),
  - (1) Benedict Calvert, 4th Baron Baltimore, by whom she had six children.
  - (2) Christopher Crowe, Consul of Leghorn, by whom she had four children.
- Charles Lee, Viscount Quarendon (6 May 1680 – 13 October 1680).
- Lieutenant-Colonel Edward Henry Lee, Viscount Quarendon (6 June 1681 – 21 October 1713), a captain in the Coldstream Guards. He died unmarried.
- James Lee (13 November 1682 – 1711) became a captain in the Royal Navy and married Sarah, daughter of Joshua Bagshaw, but the marriage stayed childless.
- Francis Lee (14 February 1685)
- Anne Lee (29 June 1686 – d. 1716?), married N Morgan
- Charles Lee (5 June 1688 – 3 January 1708). Died unmarried.
- George Henry Lee, 2nd Earl of Lichfield (12 March 1690 – 15 February 1743).
- Francis Henry Fitzroy Lee (10 September 1692 – died 1730).
- Elizabeth Lee (26 May 1693 – 29 January 1741). Married:
  - (1) Francis Lee, a cousin. Had one son and two daughters, the eldest of whom, Elisabeth (d. 1736 at Lyon) married Henry Temple, son of the 1st Viscount Palmerston.
  - (2) Edward Young, in 1731, author of the Night Thoughts, by whom she had one son. It is said that he never recovered from Elizabeth's death.
- Barbara Lee (3 March 1695 – d. aft. 1729), married Sir George Browne, 3rd Baronet of Kiddington.
- Mary Isabella Lee (6 September 1697 – 28 December 1697).
- Fitzroy Lee (10 May 1698 – died young).
- Vice Admiral FitzRoy Henry Lee (2 January 1700 – April 1751), Commodore Governor of Newfoundland.
- William Lee (24 June 1701 – died young).
- Thomas Lee (25 August 1703 – died young).
- John Lee (3 December 1704 – died young).
- Robert Lee, 4th Earl of Lichfield (3 July 1706 – 3 November 1776).

== Reign of Charles II ==
After the death of his uncle Rochester, Lee succeeded him as gentleman of the bedchamber.

== Reign of James II ==
James made Lee a gentleman of the bedchamber and his Master of the Horse.

=== The Glorious Revolution ===
When James was forced into exile in 1688, Lee accompanied him into exile and he and his wife continued to be loyal supporters of him.

== Reign of William III and Anne I ==
Since Lee was a non-juror (ie refusing to swear an oath of allegiance to Queen Anne and William he was regarded with suspicion by them. In 1696 after assassination plans on William was discovered Lee was reported as being in house arrest or taken into custody.

=== Death and legacy ===
Lichfield died two years before his wife, on 14 July 1716, aged 53 and was buried in Spelsbury church. Two years later his wife Charlotte died and was buried beside her husband.

On their funeral monument the inscription reads;

“at their marriage they were the most grateful bridegroom and the most beautiful bride and that till death they remained the most constant husband and wife.”

== Ancestry ==
Edward Henry Lee, 1st Earl of Lichfield's ancestors in three generations
Edward Henry Lee, 1st Earl of Lichfield	Father: Sir Francis Henry Lee of Ditchley, 4th Baronet of Quarendon	Paternal Grandfather: Sir Francis Henry Lee of Ditchley and of Quarendon	Paternal Great-grandfather: Sir Henry Lee of Ditchley, 1st Baronet of Quarendon
Edward Henry Lee, 1st Earl of Lichfield	Father: Sir Francis Henry Lee of Ditchley, 4th Baronet of Quarendon	Paternal Grandfather: Sir Francis Henry Lee of Ditchley and of Quarendon	Paternal Great-grandmother: Eleanor Wortley of Wortley
Edward Henry Lee, 1st Earl of Lichfield	Father: Sir Francis Henry Lee of Ditchley, 4th Baronet of Quarendon	Paternal Grandmother: Anne St John, Countess of Rochester	Paternal Great-grandfather: Sir John St John, 1st Baronet, of Lydiard Tregoze
Edward Henry Lee, 1st Earl of Lichfield	Father: Sir Francis Henry Lee of Ditchley, 4th Baronet of Quarendon	Paternal Grandmother: Anne St John, Countess of Rochester	Paternal Great-grandmother: Anne Leighton of Feckenham
Edward Henry Lee, 1st Earl of Lichfield	Mother: Lady Elizabeth Pope	Maternal Grandfather: Thomas Pope, 2nd Earl of Downe, Ireland	Maternal Great-grandfather: Sir William Pope, Knight (1596–1624)
Edward Henry Lee, 1st Earl of Lichfield	Mother: Lady Elizabeth Pope	Maternal Grandfather: Thomas Pope, 2nd Earl of Downe, Ireland	Maternal Great-grandmother: Elizabeth Watson of Halstead
Edward Henry Lee, 1st Earl of Lichfield	Mother: Lady Elizabeth Pope	Maternal Grandmother: Lucy Dutton	Maternal Great-grandfather: John Dutton of Sherborne
Edward Henry Lee, 1st Earl of Lichfield	Mother: Lady Elizabeth Pope	Maternal Grandmother: Lucy Dutton	Maternal Great-grandmother: Elizabeth Baynton of Wilts

Military offices
Preceded by The Duke of Norfolk	Colonel of the Earl of Lichfield's Regiment of Foot; 1686–1688	Succeeded by The Lord Hunsdon
Preceded by The Duke of Grafton	Colonel of the 1st Regiment of Foot Guards; 1688	Succeeded by The Duke of Grafton
Honorary titles
Preceded by The Earl of Abingdon	Lord Lieutenant of Oxfordshire; 1687–1689	Succeeded by The Earl of Abingdon
Peerage of England
New creation	Earl of Lichfield; 1673–1716	Succeeded by George Lee
Baronetage of England
Preceded by Francis Henry Lee	Baronet (of Quarendon); 1667–1716	Succeeded by George Lee
