= Taston =

Hamlet in Oxfordshire, England

Coordinates: 51.904°N 1.474°W

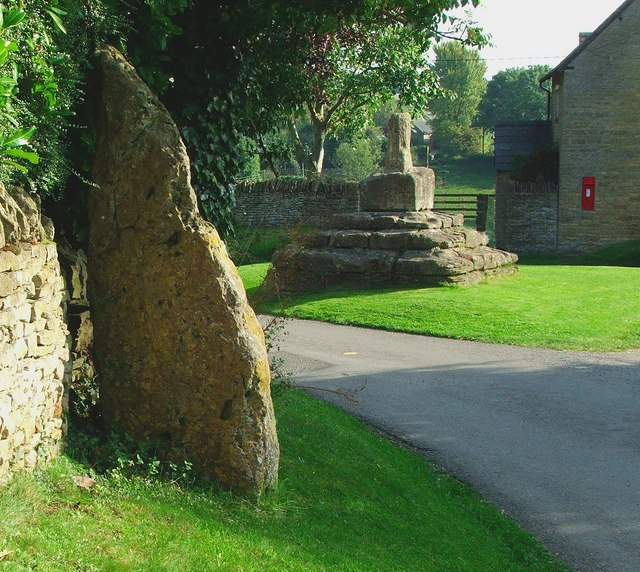
- Thor Stone (left foreground), with the Medieval preaching cross beyond

- Location within Oxfordshire
- OS grid reference: SP3621
- Civil parish: Spelsbury
- District: West Oxfordshire
- Shire county: Oxfordshire
- Region: South East
- Country: England
- Sovereign state: United Kingdom
- Post town: Chipping Norton
- Postcode district: OX7
- Dialling code: 01608
- Police: Thames Valley
- Fire: Oxfordshire
- Ambulance: South Central
- UK Parliament: Witney

Taston is a hamlet in Spelsbury civil parish, about 1.6 miles (2.6 km) north of Charlbury and 4 miles (6.4 km) southeast of Chipping Norton, Oxfordshire.

Taston is about 3 miles (4.8 km) north of the Akeman Street Roman road.

== Name ==
The survey of English Place-Names records Taston as Thorstan in 1278–9, Thorstane in 1316, Torstone in 1492 and Taston in 1608–9.

The name element Thor is a reference to the Norse god Thor. The name element stan is from Old English stān (stone ). The toponym might be Thor stone or Thor's stone.

== Thor Stone ==
The Thor Stone is a monolithic standing stone that stands about seven-foot tall in the centre of Taston. It is a menhir, meaning that it was manhandled there by humans. A local myth maintains that the stone portrays the image of a thunderbolt, and that it was created by a thunderbolt from Thor himself. It is a scheduled monument.

== Listed buildings ==
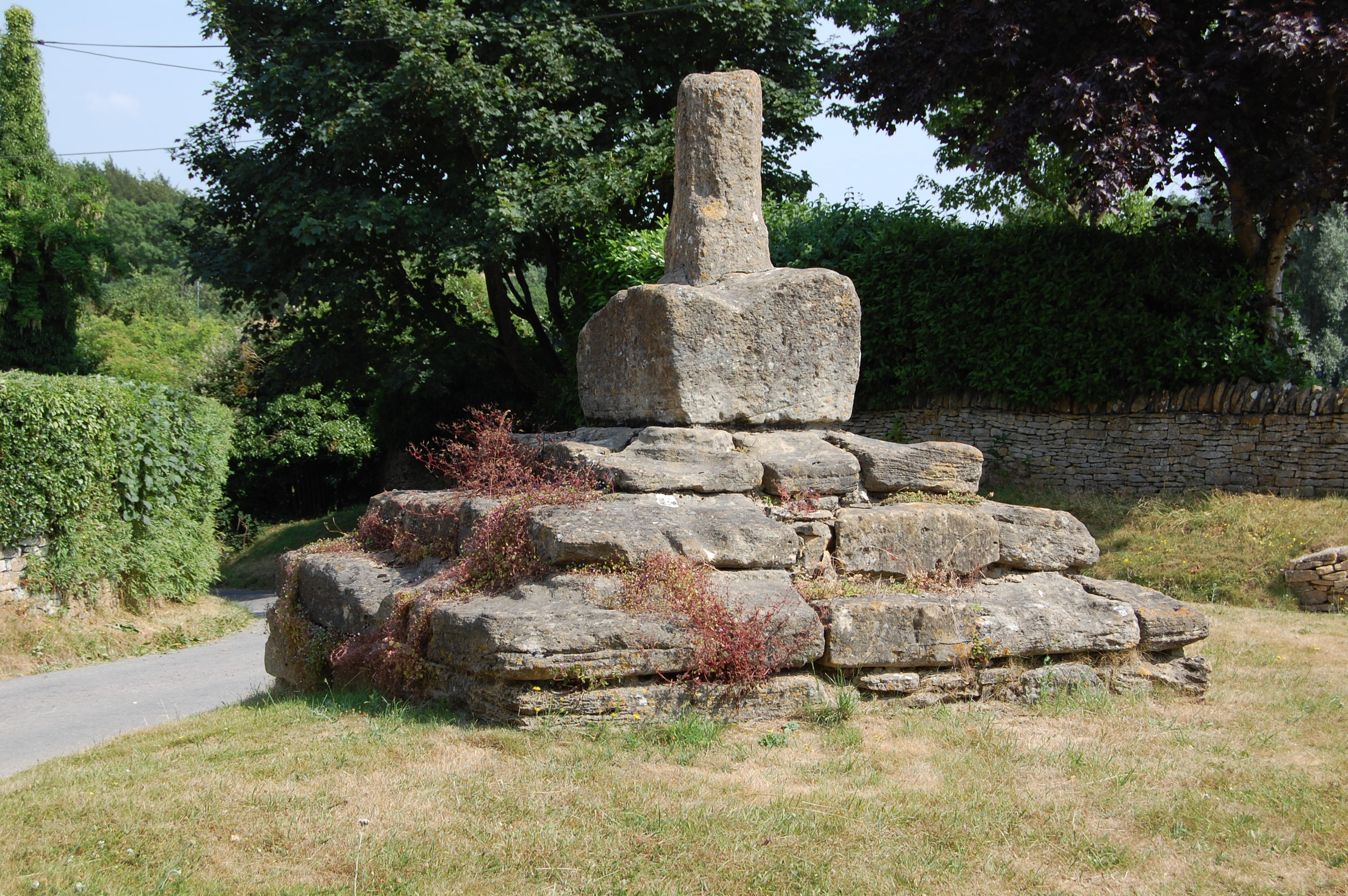
Medieval preaching cross: the steps, base and broken shaft survive

At the centre of Taston are the base and broken shaft of a Medieval preaching cross. It is a Grade II* listed building.

Middle Farmhouse is a house built of coursed rubble in the 17th and early 18th centuries. Part of the roof is of Stonesfield slate. The farmstead has a four-bay barn that was built of stone early in the 18th century and altered in 1884.

The Firkins is a small house near Thorsbrook Spring. It is built of rubble and probably dates from early in the 18th century.

At Thorsbrook Spring, about 140 yards (130 m) southeast of the preaching cross, is a Victorian Gothic Revival memorial fountain. It was built in 1862 in memory of Henrietta, Viscountess Dillon, wife of Henry Dillon, 13th Viscount Dillon.
