= Spelsbury =

Village in Oxfordshire, England

Coordinates: 51.896°N 1.492°W

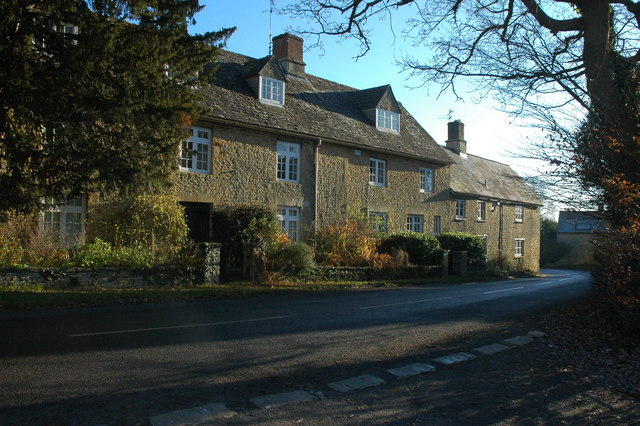
- Village main road

- Location within Oxfordshire
- Population: 305 (parish, including Dean & Taston) (2011 census)
- OS grid reference: SP3421
- Civil parish: Spelsbury
- District: West Oxfordshire
- Shire county: Oxfordshire
- Region: South East
- Country: England
- Sovereign state: United Kingdom
- Post town: Chipping Norton
- Postcode district: OX7
- Dialling code: 01608
- Police: Thames Valley
- Fire: Oxfordshire
- Ambulance: South Central
- UK Parliament: Banbury
- Website: Spelsbury Parish Council

Spelsbury is a village and civil parish about 1.5 miles (2.4 km) north of Charlbury and about 4 miles (6.4 km) southeast of Chipping Norton, Oxfordshire. The village is on a narrow hill between the Coldron and Taston brooks overlooking the River Evenlode and the ancient Wychwood Forest to the south. Spelsbury parish includes the hamlets of Dean and Taston, and also includes Ditchley Park. The 2011 census recorded the parish's population as 305.

== History ==
The toponym is derived from the Old English for either "spying place" or the place of a person called "Speol". It was first recorded in the Cartularium Saxonicum in 1010 as Speoles byrig. In 1086 the Domesday Book recorded the village as Spelesberie. Spelsbury has a group of almshouses built in 1688 by John Carry. Coldron Mill, south-west of the village, is on a site where a mill has existed for at least a thousand years. Winterberry Park built in 1725 by Thomas Archer is on the parish borders. In the village a drinking fountain in the shape of a shell was built around 1855 to commemorate Constantine Dillon, the deceased son of Henry Dillon, 13th Viscount Dillon. The poet John Wilmot, 2nd Earl of Rochester and his wife Elizabeth Malet lived and are buried in Spelsbury. The actor Sir Ben Kingsley lives in the village.

The Church of England parish church of All Saints was originally Norman with a central tower. In about 1200 transepts were added, but during the 13th century the Early English Gothic nave was built on the site of the Norman chancel. The nave is flanked by north and south aisles. The present west doorway in the tower and several of the windows in the aisles are early 14th century. In 1706 the 1st Earl of Lichfield had the bell tower restored. In 1740 the 2nd Earl of Lichfield had the chancel rebuilt. In 1774 the 4th Earl of Lichfield had the nave and aisles remodelled. The chancel was rebuilt again in 1851. In 2001 the Church of England Benefice of Ascott-under-Wychwood, Chadlington and Spelsbury merged with that of Enstone and Heythrop to form the Chase Benefice.

=== Parish ===
Spelsbury was an ancient parish, which became a civil parish in 1866. Until 1985 the parish also included the hamlet of Fulwell, but in that year Fulwell was transferred to the civil parish of Enstone. At the same time the eastern part of Ditchley Park was transferred from the civil parish of Kiddington with Asterleigh to the parish of Spelsbury.

== Sources and further reading ==
- Corbett, E (1962). A History of Spelsbury. Banbury: Cheney and Sons.
- Hudson, Christopher (13 November 2005). "The great debauchee". The Sunday Times.
- Johnston, Sheila (3 April 2009). "Ben Kingsley interview: dark soul of the knight". The Daily Telegraph.
- Mudd, Andrew (1987). "Fieldwalking at Spelsburydown and in the Chadlington Area" (PDF). Oxoniensia. LII. Oxfordshire Architectural and Historical Society: 11–22.
- Sherwood, Jennifer; Pevsner, Nikolaus (1974). Oxfordshire. The Buildings of England. Harmondsworth: Penguin Books. pp. 774–776. ISBN 0-14-071045-0.
