= Charlotte Lee, Countess of Lichfield =

Illegitimate daughter of King Charles II of England

The Right Honourable The Countess of Lichfield
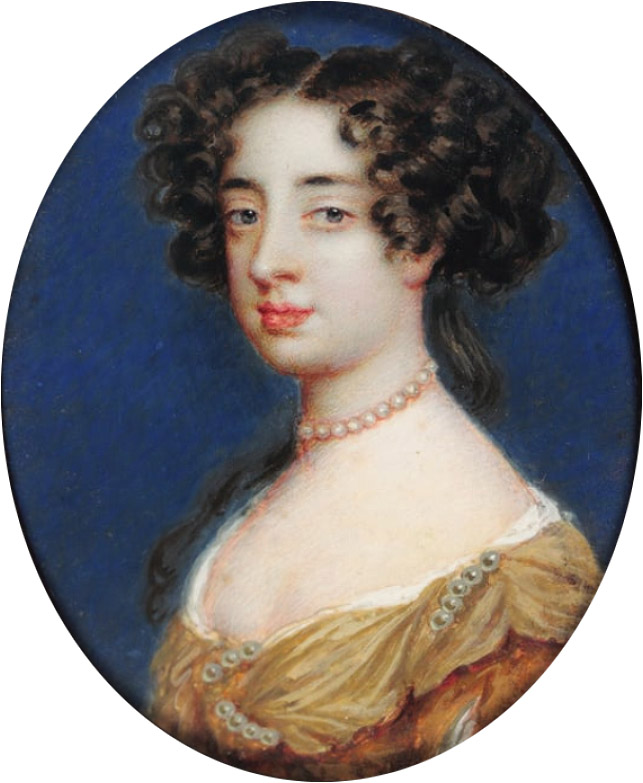
- Charlotte Fitzroy, Countess of Lichfield
- Born: 5 September 1664
- Died: 17 February 1718 (aged 53)
- Noble family: Stuart
- Spouse: Edward Lee, 1st Earl of Lichfield (m. 1677; died 1716)
- Issue: Charlotte Lee, Lady Baltimore; Charles Lee, Viscount Quarendon; Edward Lee, Viscount Quarendon; Captain Hon. James Lee; Hon. Francis Lee; Lady Anne Morgan; Hon. Charles Lee; George Lee, 2nd Earl of Lichfield; Hon. Francis Henry Fitzroy Lee; Lady Elizabeth Young; Barbara Browne, Lady Browne; Lady Mary Lee; Hon. Fitzroy Lee; Hon. FitzRoy Henry Lee; Hon. William Lee; Hon. Thomas Lee; Hon. John Lee; Robert Lee, 4th Earl of Lichfield
- Father: Charles II of England
- Mother: Barbara Villiers, 1st Duchess of Cleveland

Charlotte Lee, Countess of Lichfield (5 September 1664 – 17 February 1718), formerly Lady Charlotte FitzRoy, was the illegitimate daughter of King Charles II of England by one of his best known mistresses, Barbara Villiers, 1st Duchess of Cleveland. Known for her beauty, Charlotte was married at age 12 to her husband, Edward Henry Lee, 1st Earl of Lichfield, with whom she had a large family.

== Early life ==
Charlotte Lee was born Charlotte Fitzroy, on 5 September 1664, the fourth child and second daughter of Barbara Palmer, Countess of Castlemaine, the only child of the Royalist commander William Villiers, 2nd Viscount Grandison.

She was placed in the care of a governess; in Berkshire House. Also living there were her siblings, as well as older brother Charles' betrothed Mary Wood (daughter of Sir Henry Wood) whom Charlotte's mother had more or less abducted and had decided to bring up with her own children.

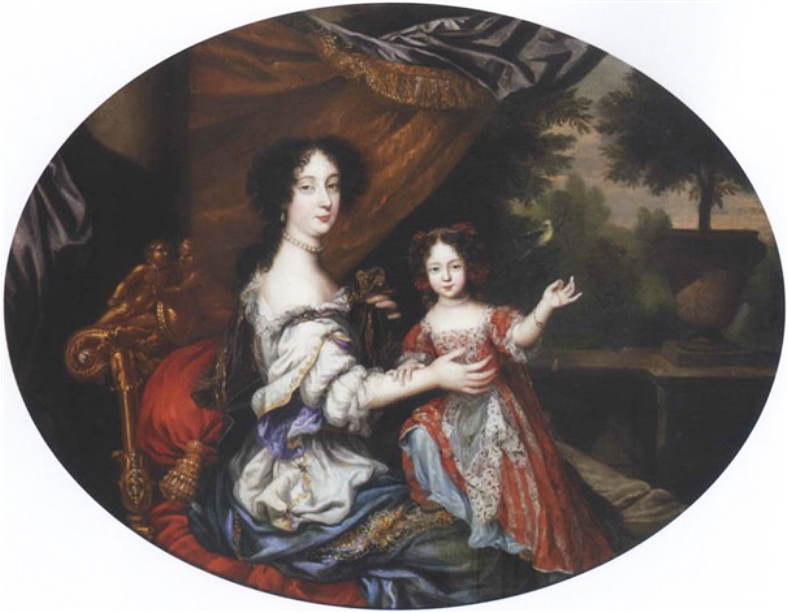
Charlotte with her mother painted by Henri Gascar

Charlotte Fitzroy's mother had separated from her husband Roger Palmer, 1st Earl of Castlemaine, but was still married to him. Castlemaine did not father any of his wife's children; Charlotte and her siblings were the illegitimate offspring of their mother's royal lover, Charles II. The king acknowledged his daughter and so she bore the surname of Fitzroy – "child of the King".

The diarist Samuel Pepys noted that the child would likely have good marriage prospects: "my Lady Castlemayne [Barbara Villiers] will in merriment say that her daughter (not above a year old or two) will be the first mayde in the Court that will be married…"

Charlotte was for her royal blood and connections seen as a great match and in 1672, Sir Francis Radclyffe; an ambitious man tried to bring about a marriage between the eight-year-old Charlotte and his nineteen-year-old son Edward Radclyffe. He approached and gained a meeting with Lord Grandison (the great-uncle of Charlotte) and Lord Clifford (councillor to Charles II). But for whatever reason, nothing came of the marriage and Edward would instead come to be married to Charlotte's half-sister Mary Tudor, the daughter of Moll Davis.

In 1673, Charlotte and her older sister Anne were given coat of arms and made Lady Companions of the Order of the Garter. They were also accorded the dignities accorded to the daughters of a duke.

Since Charlotte's mother was being displaced in the favors of the king by his new mistress Louise de Keroualle and her mother displeased, had threatened to go abroad. So in March 1676, Charlotte accompanied her mother and three of her siblings to France. Charlotte and her younger sister Barbara were sent to be educated at the convent of the Conceptionist Order of the Immaculate Conception of Our Lady, at Faubourg Saint-Antoine in Paris. It is interesting to note that three nieces of Charlotte's mother's estranged husband (the Earl of Castlemaine) were also living there at the same time.

After Charlotte's father demanded to see his daughter, Charlotte returned to England in 1677 for the formalization of her marriage. Her mother remained in Paris until 1684.

Charlotte was the favourite niece of James, Duke of York, younger brother of Charles II, who would later reign as King James II. The historian John Heneage Jesse wrote of Charlotte Fitzroy: "we know but little of her except that she was beautiful." As a child, Charlotte was painted by the court painter Sir Peter Lely, Charles II's Principal Painter in Ordinary, in which she is seated with her Indian page, holding a bunch of grapes and dressed in pink silk. Today, the painting hangs in the York Art Gallery.

The art historian Anna Brownell Jameson described Charlotte Fitzroy as having "rivaled her mother in beauty, but was far unlike her in every other respect."

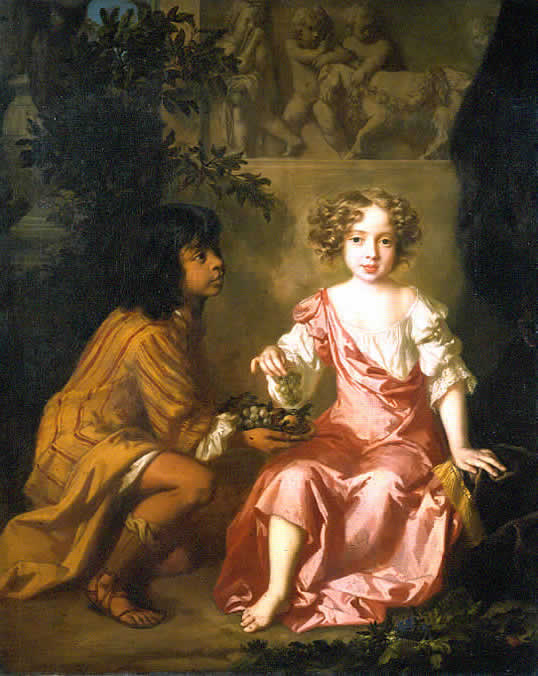
Charlotte as a child painted by Peter Lely (ca. 1672)

Her mother was said to be a "cruel and austere" parent who would often use her children for emotional blackmail against the king, at one time threatening "to bring all of his (Charles') bastards to his closet - door" (i.e., abandoning them).

Another evidence for her being a very harsh mother is when Charlotte accidentally broke the glass window of her mother's coach when traveling through the park; she was so distraught that she started crying in fear of her punishment. A witness to the accident sent a message to her father and he swiftly sent a message to Palmer that their daughter was not to be punished.

It appears that Charles II was a loving father. In 1682 he wrote to Charlotte: "I must tell you I am glad to hear you are with child, and I hope to see you here before it be long, that I may have the satisfaction myself of telling you how much I love you, and how truly I am your kind father, Charles Rex".

Charles also funded a townhouse to be built by Sir Christopher Wren in 1677 named Lichfield House; it was adjoined by another home which is today known as 10 Downing Street.

While Charlotte was not directly involved in politics, on account of her being kin to royalty, she was seen as a conduit to make things known to her relatives, such as when her paternal uncle and aunt, the Duke and Duchess of York, were travelling through England and were respectfully greeted by authorities and local nobility. One of the exceptions being

Sir Robert Carr with Sir Robert Tirrill in his coach, attended only by one servant on horseback, met him; he did not so much as light out of his coach, and so the Duke without taking much notice of him passed on. My Lady Lichfield, by the "advice of my wife", (Charlotte's mother-in-law) acquainted the Duke with Sir "Robert Carrs having met the Duke of Monmouth, "and the great care he took to have his Grace well received in that town, and the small concern he had expressed for his Highness' reception.

— Robert Bertie, 3rd Earl of Lindsey, 1 November 1679. Letter from Robert Bertie, 3rd Earl of Lindsey, to the Rt. Hon. the Earl of Danby

== Marriage and children ==
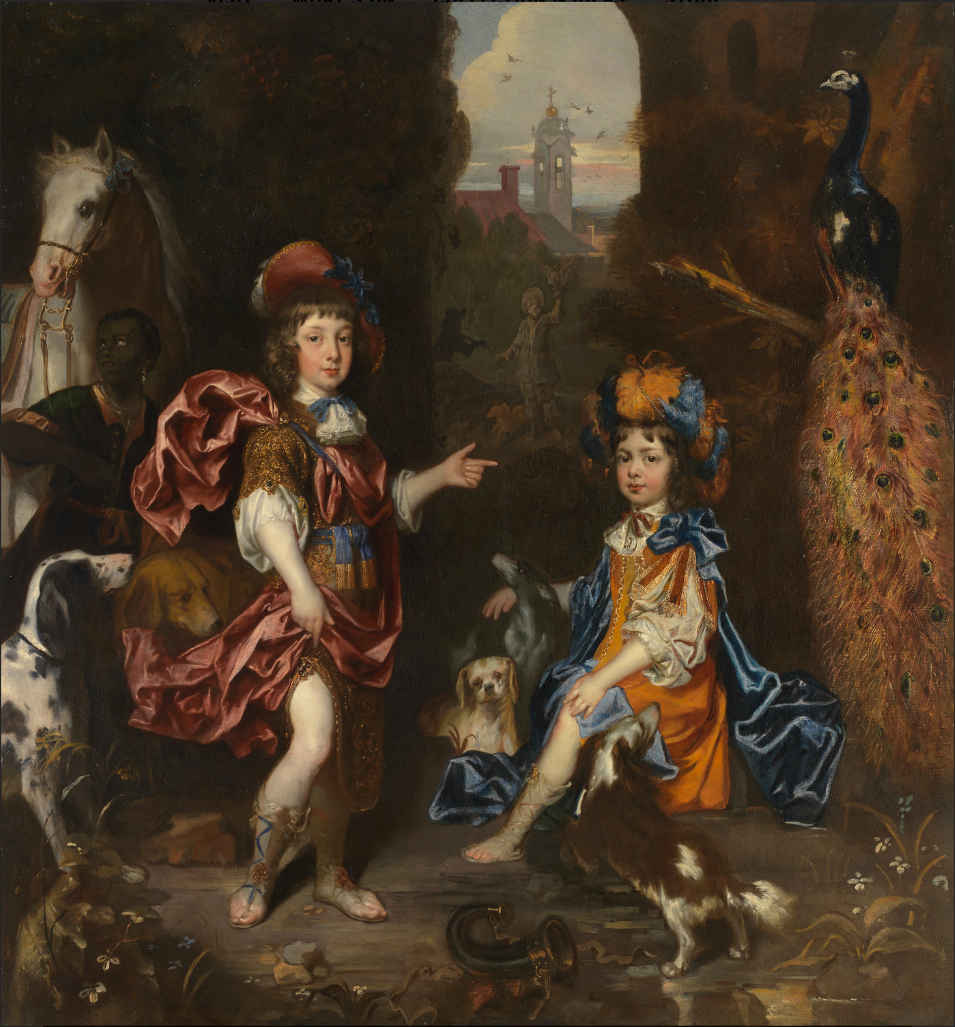
Charlotte Fitzroy and her husband Edward Henry Lee, 1st Earl of Lichfield, as children, painted by Peter Lely.

Charlotte's mother Barbara was a second cousin of the politically savvy Anne St. John, Countess of Rochester was mother of the influential courtier John Wilmot, Earl of Rochester through Sir John St John.

Through their efforts a betrothal between Charlotte and her second-cousin-once-removed, Sir Edward Henry Lee was made and then officially contracted May 1674, before her tenth birthday. The young couple underwent a form of marriage ceremony on 11 August 1674, but the marriage was not formalised until 6 February 1677, in her thirteenth year.

When Charles Stewart, 6th Duke of Lennox, died in 1673, Sir Edward was created Earl of Lichfield. Charlotte's dowry was agreed at £18,000, and her husband was awarded a pension of £2,000 per year. Together they had eighteen children:

- Charlotte Lee, Lady Baltimore (13 March 1678 (Old Style) – 22 January 1721),
  - (1) Benedict Calvert, 4th Baron Baltimore, by whom she had six children.
  - (2) Christopher Crowe, Consul of Leghorn, by whom she had four children.
- Charles Lee, Viscount Quarendon (6 May 1680 – 13 October 1680).
- Edward Henry Lee, Viscount Quarendon (6 June 1681 – 21 October 1713).
- Captain Hon. James Lee (13 November 1682 – 1711).
- The Hon. Francis Lee (14 February 1685).
- Lady Anne Lee (29 June 1686 – d. 1716?), married N Morgan.
- The Hon. Charles Lee (5 June 1688 – 3 January 1708).
- George Henry Lee, 2nd Earl of Lichfield (12 March 1690 – 15 February 1743).
- The Hon. Francis Henry Fitzroy Lee (10 September 1692 – died 1730).
- Lady Elizabeth Lee (26 May 1693 – 29 January 1741). Married:
  - (1) Francis Lee, a cousin. Had one son and two daughters, the eldest of whom, Elisabeth (d. 1736 at Lyon) married Henry Temple, son of the 1st Viscount Palmerston.
  - (2) Edward Young, in 1731, author of the Night Thoughts, by whom she had one son. It is said that he never recovered from Elizabeth's death.
- Lady Barbara Lee (3 March 1695 – d. aft. 1729), married Sir George Browne, 3rd Baronet of Kiddington.
- Lady Mary Isabella Lee (6 September 1697 – 28 December 1697).
- The Hon. Fitzroy Lee (10 May 1698 – died young).
- Vice Admiral Hon. FitzRoy Henry Lee (2 January 1700 – April 1751), Commodore Governor of Newfoundland.
- The Hon. William Lee (24 June 1701 – died young).
- The Hon. Thomas Lee (25 August 1703 – died young).
- The Hon. John Lee (3 December 1704 – died young).
- Robert Lee, 4th Earl of Lichfield (3 July 1706 – 3 November 1776).

== Later life ==
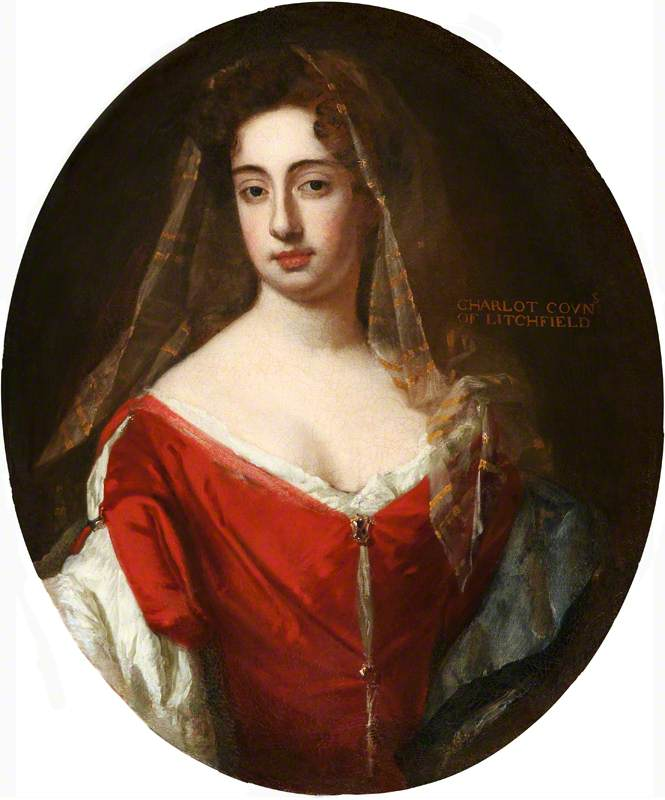
Charlotte Lee, Countess of Lichfield, painted by Godfrey Kneller.

After the death of her husband's cousin Charles Wilmot, 3rd Earl of Rochester the couple inherited Adderbury Manor which they had torn down and then had the architect build a new Palladian manor on the spot. Lee participated in court life and was frequently in presence at Windsor castle and is mentioned by as being present at a gathering on 24 Jan 1682 in honor of the Moroccan ambassador Mohammed ben Hadou.

and among these were the King's natural children, namely, Lady Lichfield...

— John Evelyn, The Diary of John Evelyn, p. 164

In 1685, her father suffered an apoplectic fit and died four days later at the Palace of Whitehall.

=== Reign of James II ===
After the death of her father in 1685, Charlotte continued to be part of the inner circle of the new king, who was her uncle James and a great favorite of his wife Mary of Modena. Charlotte's husband became appointed as the Master of the Horse to the king.

After the birth of James Francis Edward, his father's political enemies and her cousins, Anne and Mary, tried to claim that the newborn was not the son of James II but rather a changeling. This was in fact an effort to prevent a Catholic dynasty from ruling the country as James was not only suspect of being a catholic but also had married a catholic wife. Charlotte had not been present for the childbirth of Mary in 1688, but she was prepared to vouch for the legitimacy of her cousin.

Charlotte testified;

That she was not at the Queen's Labour, (being in Child-bed her self) but that she was almost constantly with the Queen, while she was with Child, and hath put on her Smock, and seen the Milk run out of her Breast, and felt her Belly; so that she is sure she could not be deceived, but that the Queen was with Child.

=== Reign of Mary II and William III ===
Due to Charlotte and her husband's staunch support of Charlotte's uncle James II, who was deposed in 1689 in the Glorious Revolution, the couple were not allowed at court and Charlotte and her husband withdrew to their estate at Ditchley in Oxfordshire. In 1690, her "deare brother" Henry died after receiving a gunshot wound during the siege of Cork while fighting for William III. One year later, Charlotte's younger sister, Barbara, who had been seduced by count of Arran, gave birth to an illegitimate son and was from thereon disowned by their mother and sent to a convent.

=== Reign of Anne ===
In 1702, when Charlotte asked her cousin queen Anne if she would not allow her to attend court, Anne simply replied that no such thing was possible until Charlotte's husband had pledged his loyalty to her. As her husband was not willing to do such a thing, they were not part of the court.

The tumultuous happenings continued, when in 1705, another scandal occurred in Charlotte's family when her oldest daughter Charlotte and her husband Lord Baltimore were separated, followed in 1706, by Charlotte having an affair with the notorious Colonel Robert Fielding, the husband of her grandmother the Duchess of Cleveland. She was also rumoured to have given birth to child fathered by Fielding. Fielding later turned out to be a bigamist making his marriage with his lover's grandmother illegal.

In 1709, Charlotte's mother, the Duchess of Cleveland died of dropsy, and left in her will to her daughter Charlotte "the picture of herself and the Earl of Lichfield, her husband drawn together with the picture of her grandson Lord Quarendon with the great bloodstone".

== Death and legacy ==
Charlotte Lee died in London on 17 February 1718, aged 53, and was buried in All Saints Churchyard in Spelsbury, Oxfordshire, England beside her husband who had died two years earlier. On their funeral monument the inscription reads;

“at their marriage they were the most grateful bridegroom and the most beautiful bride and that till death they remained the most constant husband and wife.”

In her will, she left her three younger sons £100 each, and to her daughter Barbara £2000 (if she married with the consent of her brother) and £200 to the Roman Catholic bishop Bonaventure Giffard.

== Cultural mentions ==
The French writer Charles de Saint-Evremond included Lee as a topic of interest in his vignette of imagined conversation between a nobleman and Mrs. Myddelton

Madam Litchfields more vibrant demeanour Would endear her greatly to all those who meet her

The countess of Lichfield appears as a character in "Devil water" (1961) by Anya Seton.

Lee is mentioned in the book "A good day for marrying a duke" by Betina Krahn whose fictional protagonist is her descendant.

Appears as a character in "The remarkable life & times of Eliza Rose" (2006) by Mary Hooper
