= Ditchley Park =

Grade I listed house in Oxfordshire, England

Coordinates: 51.8879°N 1.4344°W

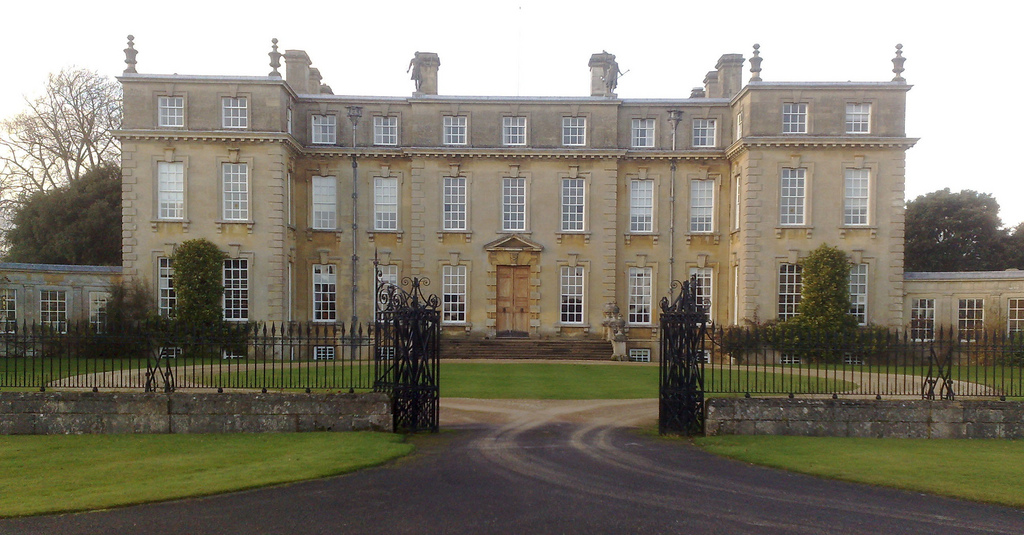

- Location within Oxfordshire
- Type: House
- Location: Charlbury, Oxfordshire

History
- Built: 1720; 306 years ago

Site notes
- Architect(s): James Gibbs exterior / William Kent, Henry Flitcroft interiors
- Architectural style: Palladian
- Governing body: Ditchley Foundation

Listed Building – Grade I
- Official name: Ditchley House Including flanking pavilions
- Designated: 27 August 1957
- Reference no.: 1251422

Listed Building – Grade II*
- Official name: Rotunda 600M NW of Ditchley House
- Designated: 27 August 1957
- Reference no.: 1251530

Listed Building – Grade II
- Official name: Entrance Screen, gates and balustrading to forecourt of Ditchley House
- Designated: 30 August 1988
- Reference no.: 1262725

Listed Building – Grade II
- Official name: Steps and flanking statuary 20M NW of Ditchley House
- Designated: 30 August 1988
- Reference no.: 1262763

National Register of Historic Parks and Gardens
- Official name: Ditchley Park
- Designated: 1 June 1984
- Reference no.: 1000463

Ditchley Park is a country house near Charlbury in Oxfordshire, England. The estate was once the site of a Roman villa. Later it became a royal hunting ground, and then the property of Sir Henry Lee of Ditchley. The 2nd Earl of Lichfield built the present house, designed by James Gibbs, in 1722. In 1933, the house was bought by an MP, Ronald Tree, whose wife Nancy Lancaster redecorated it in partnership with Sibyl Colefax. During the Second World War Winston Churchill used the house as a weekend retreat, due to concerns that his official country house, Chequers and his private country home, Chartwell, were vulnerable to enemy attack. After the war, Tree sold the house and estate to the 7th Earl of Wilton, who then sold it in 1953 to Sir David Wills of the Wills tobacco family. Wills established the Ditchley Foundation for the promotion of international relations and subsequently donated the house to the governing trust.

Ditchley is a Grade I listed building. The park is listed Grade II*.

== History ==
Ditchley was a medieval village recorded between the 14th and 17th centuries. No trace of the deserted medieval village is now visible. Ditchley once provided lodging and access to the royal hunting ground of Wychwood Forest. In the Elizabethan era, the estate was purchased by the Lee family. Sir Henry Lee (1533–1611) was a noted courtier. He commissioned the Ditchley Portrait of Queen Elizabeth I, which shows her standing on a map of the British Isles, surveying her dominions; one foot rests near Ditchley in Oxfordshire, to commemorate her visit to Sir Henry Lee there. He was later noted for declining to receive his monarch a second time, because of the enormous expense. King James VI and I and Anne of Denmark visited on 15 September 1603 with the French ambassador and a duke, whom Arbella Stuart called the "Dutchkin."

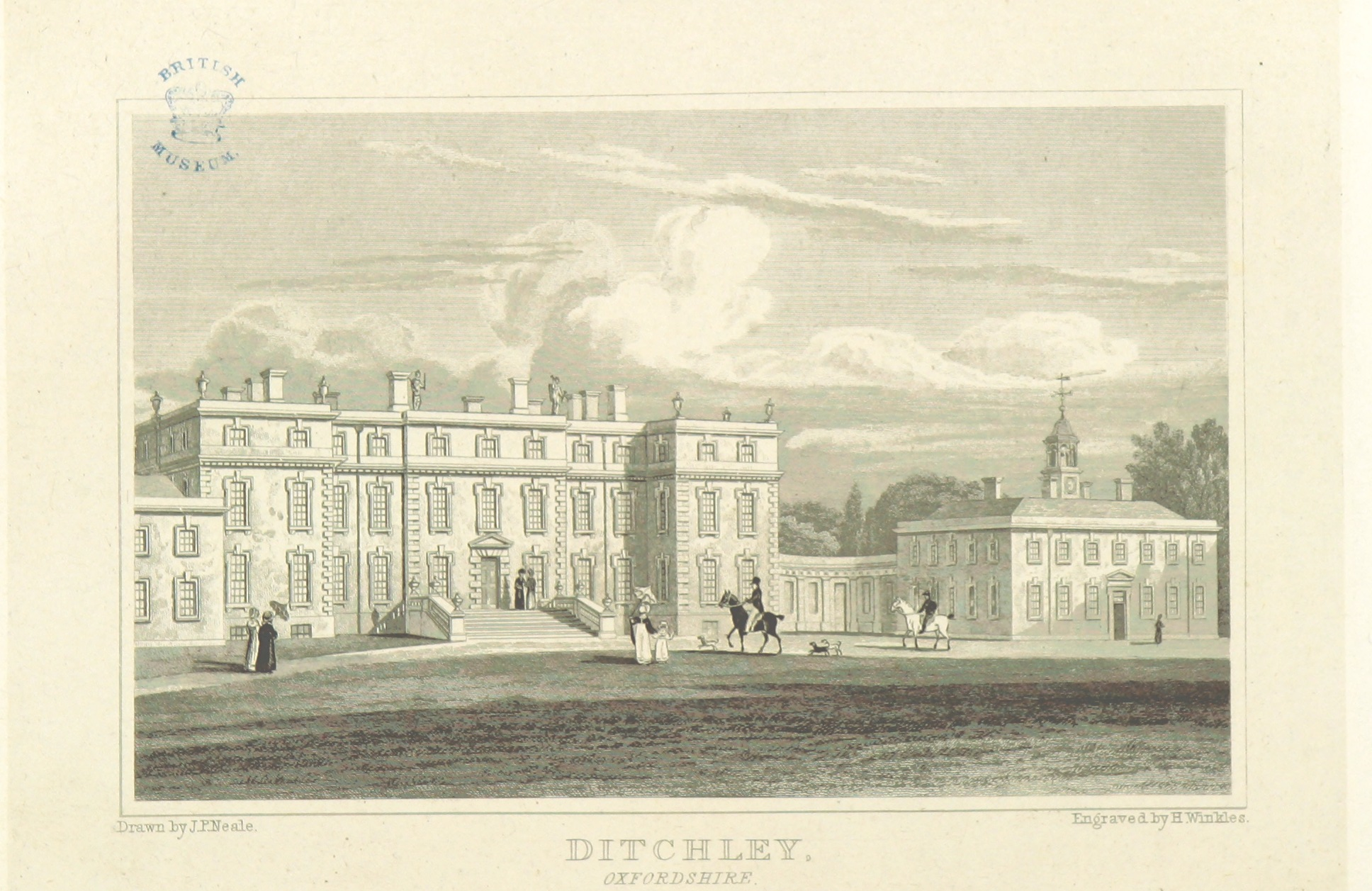
Ditchley, Oxfordshire c. 1818

Subsequent occupants include Sir Henry Lee, 1st Bt., of Quarendon, later of Ditchley (died by 1632), Sir Francis Henry Lee, 2nd Bt., of Quarendon (1616–1639), his widow Anne, Countess of Rochester, The 2nd Earl of Rochester who was born at the house, Sir Henry Lee, 3rd Bt. (1633–1659), Sir Francis Lee, 4th Baronet of Quarendon, Charlotte, Countess of Lichfield, illegitimate daughter of Charles II, and Robert Lee, 4th Earl of Lichfield. In 1763 architect Stiff Leadbetter designed and built an Ionic rotunda in the grounds for the Earl. The estate then became the property of the Viscounts Dillon.

=== Tree family ===
In 1933, after the death of Harold Dillon, 17th Viscount Dillon, an Anglo-Irish peer, Ditchley was bought by Anglo-American Ronald Tree and his wife, the celebrated decorator Nancy Lancaster. It was the decoration of Ditchley which earned Nancy the reputation of having "the finest taste of almost anyone in the world." She worked on it with Sibyl Colefax (Mrs Bethell of Elden Ltd having died in 1932) and the French decorator Stéphane Boudin of the Paris firm Jansen. In November 1933, Ronald was elected MP for Harborough, Leicestershire. Tree and his wife Nancy were among those who saw the Nazi threat, and had invited Winston Churchill and his wife to dinner on numerous occasions from 1937.

=== Churchill ===
On the outbreak of war, the security forces were concerned by the visibility of both Churchill's country house, Chartwell – its high site, and its position south of London, making it an easy returning-home target for German aircraft – and the Prime Minister's official retreat of Chequers, which had an entrance road which was clearly visible from the sky when illuminated by moonlight. Churchill had use of the Paddock bunker in Neasden, but only used it on one occasion for a cabinet meeting before returning to his Cabinet War Room bunker in Whitehall. Ditchley, with its heavy foliage and lack of a visible access road, was an ideal site. Churchill asked Tree for "accommodation at Ditchley for certain weekends, when the moon is high" and he readily consented. Churchill first went to Ditchley in lieu of Chequers on 9 November 1940, accompanied by his wife Clementine and daughter Mary. During visits to Ditchley, Churchill negotiated part of the Lend-Lease agreement with President Roosevelt's special advisor Harry Hopkins, and had exiled Czechoslovak President Edvard Beneš as a guest. By late 1942, security at Chequers had been improved, including covering the road with turf. The last weekend Churchill attended Ditchley as his official residence was Tree's birthday on 26 September 1942, and his final visit was for lunch in 1943. In June 1994, US Secretary of State Warren Christopher and British Foreign Secretary Douglas Hurd unveiled a bronze bust of Churchill, which stands in a prominent position to highlight the role that Ditchley Park played during a critical phase of the Second World War.

=== Recent decades ===
Shortly after the end of the war, Tree divorced Nancy and married Marietta Peabody Fitzgerald, an American woman he had met while working for the Ministry of Information. Marietta moved into Ditchley, but found English country life not to her liking. Noticing his wife's upset, and short of money, Tree sold Ditchley to Sir David Wills, descendant of the tobacco importing family, W. D. & H. O. Wills of Bristol; and moved with his family and butler Collins to New York. In 1958 Wills set up a trust, the Ditchley Foundation, which aims to promote international (especially Anglo-American) relations, and which still owns the house today. Ditchley was used to film scenes from the first episode of the final series of Downton Abbey. In 2002, it became the home of the Butler Valet School.

== Architecture and listing designations ==
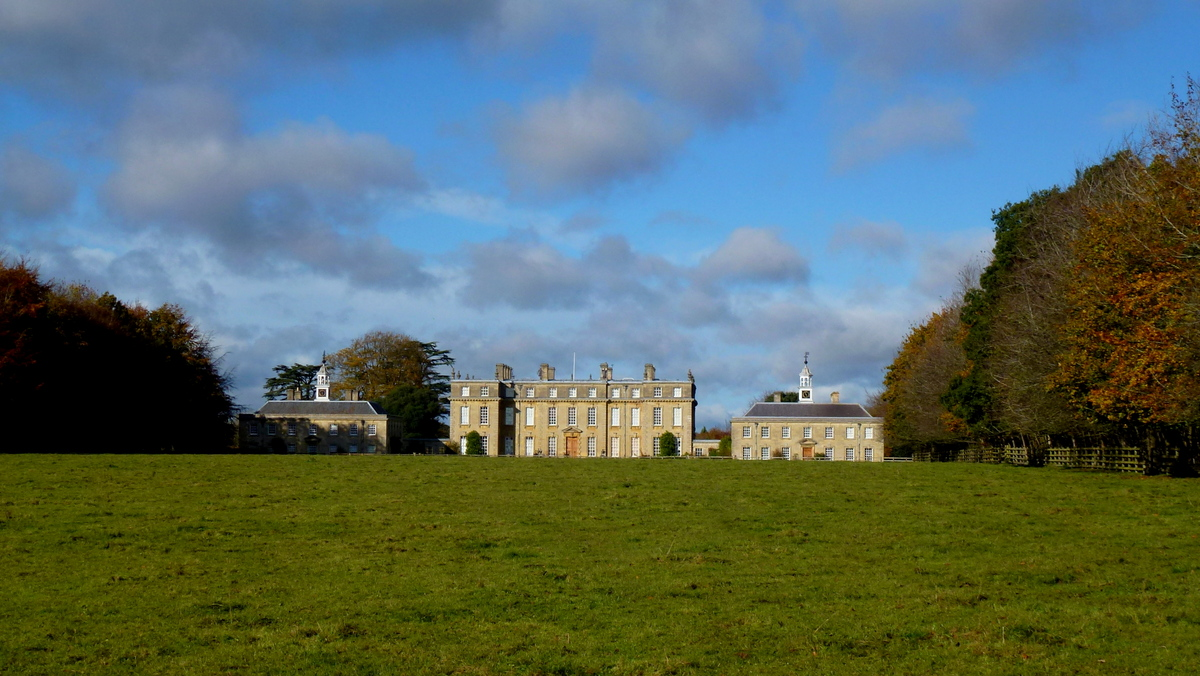
The house and flanking pavilions.

The present house was built in 1722 for George Lee, 2nd Earl of Lichfield. The architect was James Gibbs and the builder was Francis Smith. William Kent and Henry Flitcroft designed the interiors. The fireplaces are by Edward Stanton and his partner Christopher Horsnaile. Ditchley Park is a Grade I listed building on the Historic England listing record. Other listed structures proximate to the house, and which are designated Grade II, include the entrance screen, gates and balustrading to the forecourt, steps and statuary to the north-west of the house, the Lion Court, walled gardens and Lion Gate to the north-east, the Stable Block, and the gas house.

The park is listed at Grade II* on the Register of Historic Parks and Gardens of Special Historic Interest in England. Listed features in the park include the Rotunda at Grade II*, and the Little Temple, the Lake Head and Grotto, and the Lower House, all of which are designated Grade II.

== Archaeology ==
There are remains of a Roman villa on the Ditchley Park estate at Watts Wells, less than 1 mile (1.6 km) southeast of the house. It was a colonnaded house with outbuildings, threshing floors, and a granary with capacity for the produce of about 1,000 acres (400 ha) of arable land. It was surrounded by a rectangular ditch 360 yards (330 m) by 330 yards (300 m). The site is less than two miles (three kilometres) north of the course of Akeman Street Roman road, and is one of a number of Roman villas and Romano-British farmsteads that have been identified in the area, apparently associated with the territory bounded by Grim's Ditch. The villa site was identified by aerial archaeology in 1934 and excavated in 1935. It was found to have been first settled in about AD 70 with a set of timber-framed buildings, which were replaced in stone in the 2nd century. In about AD 200 a fire severely damaged the stone buildings and the site was abandoned. The site was reoccupied early in the 4th century, and occupation on a more modest scale than before continued until the end of that century. Some time before the villa was discovered and excavated, a hoard of 1,176 bronze Roman coins was found between Box Wood and Out Wood, about 600 yards (550 m) to 700 yards (640 m) northeast of the villa site. The coins range in date from about AD 270 onwards and seem to have been buried in a ceramic pot about AD 395, towards the end of the Roman occupation. The hoard was transferred to the Ashmolean Museum in Oxford in 1935.

Grim's Ditch, which passes through the present park and estate, is an ancient boundary believed to have been constructed during the Roman occupation of Britain in about the 1st century AD. The toponym "Ditchley" is derived from a compound of two Old English words, meaning the woodland clearing ("-ley") on Grim's Ditch.

== Gallery ==
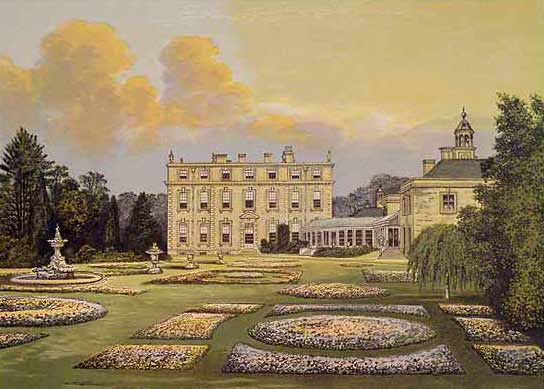
Ditchley House, side view, 1880

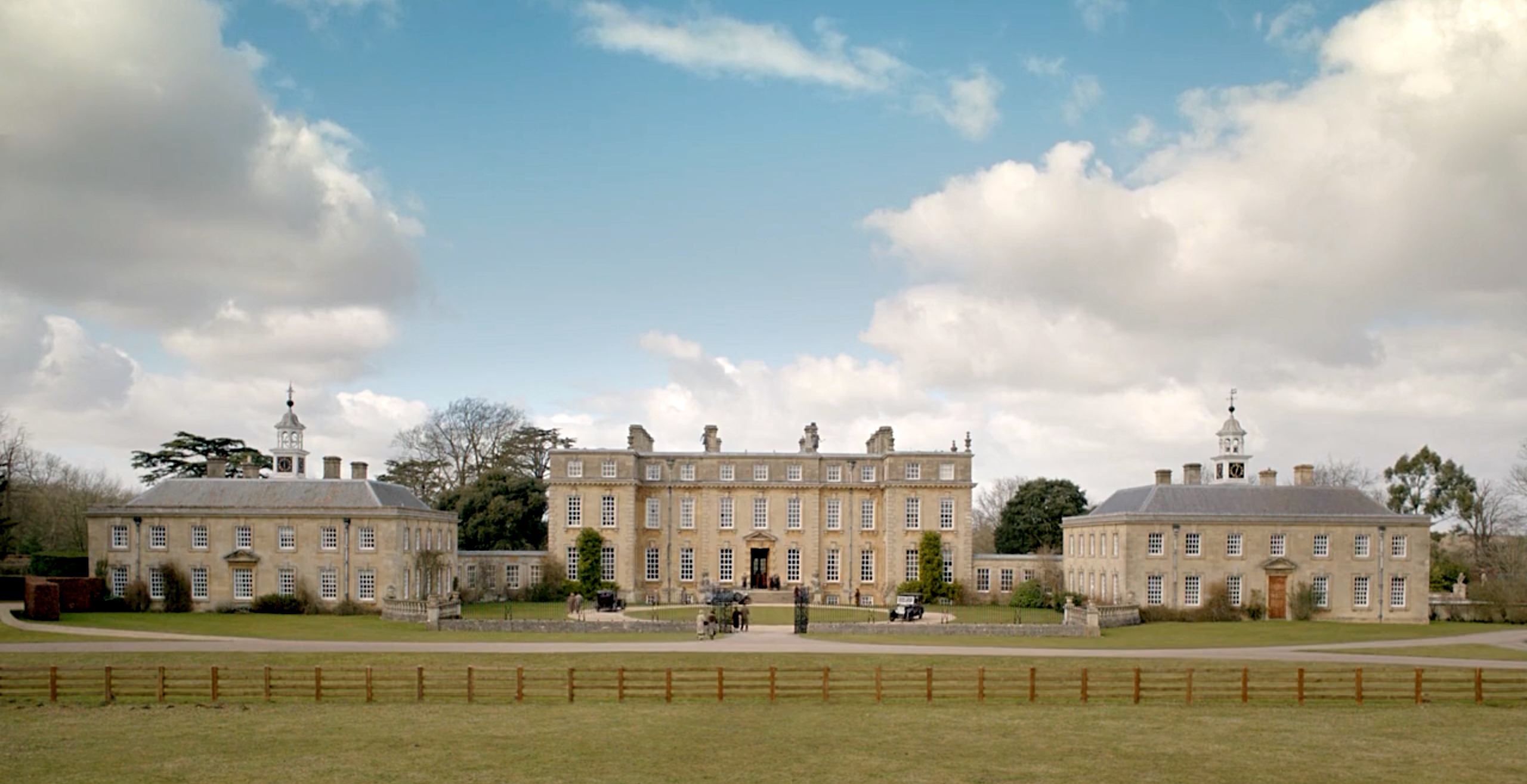

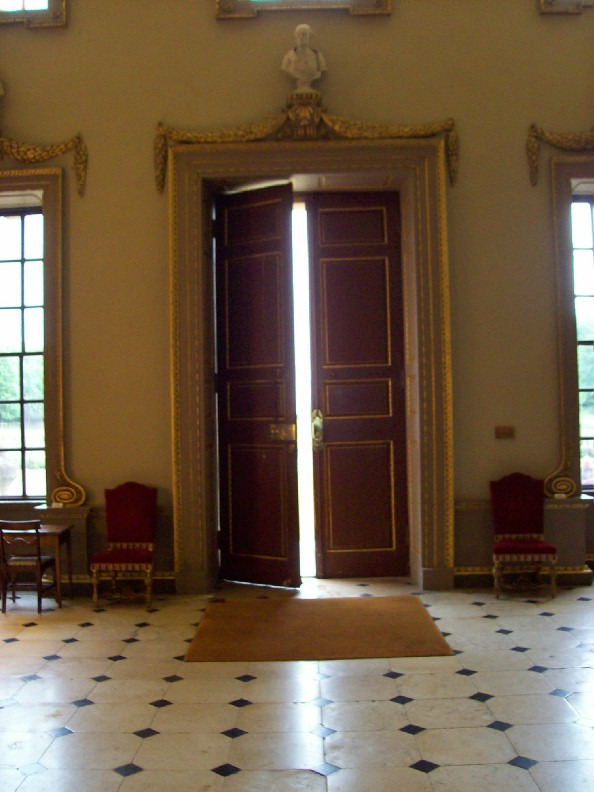
Main door of Ditchley House

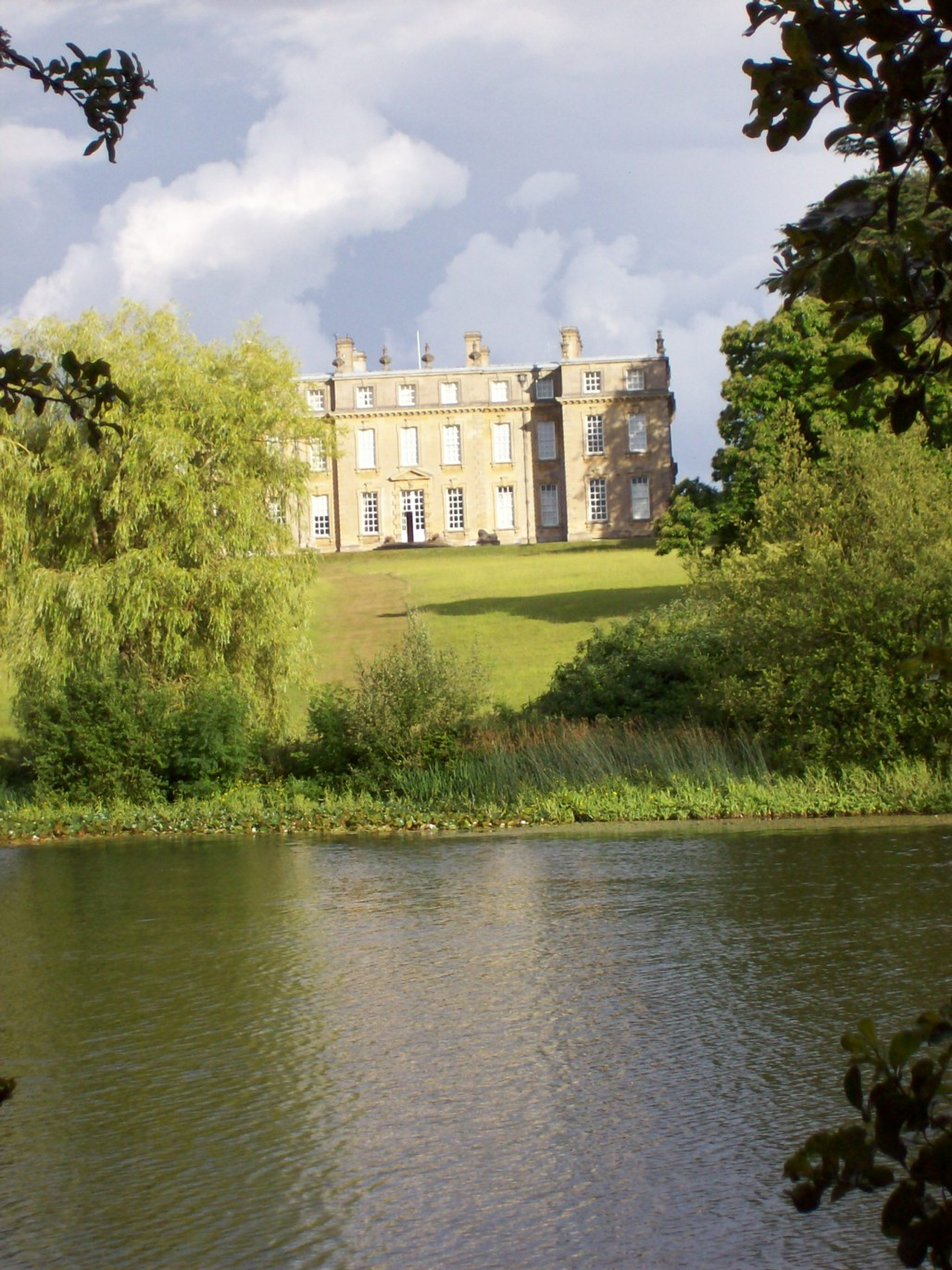
Ditchley from the lake

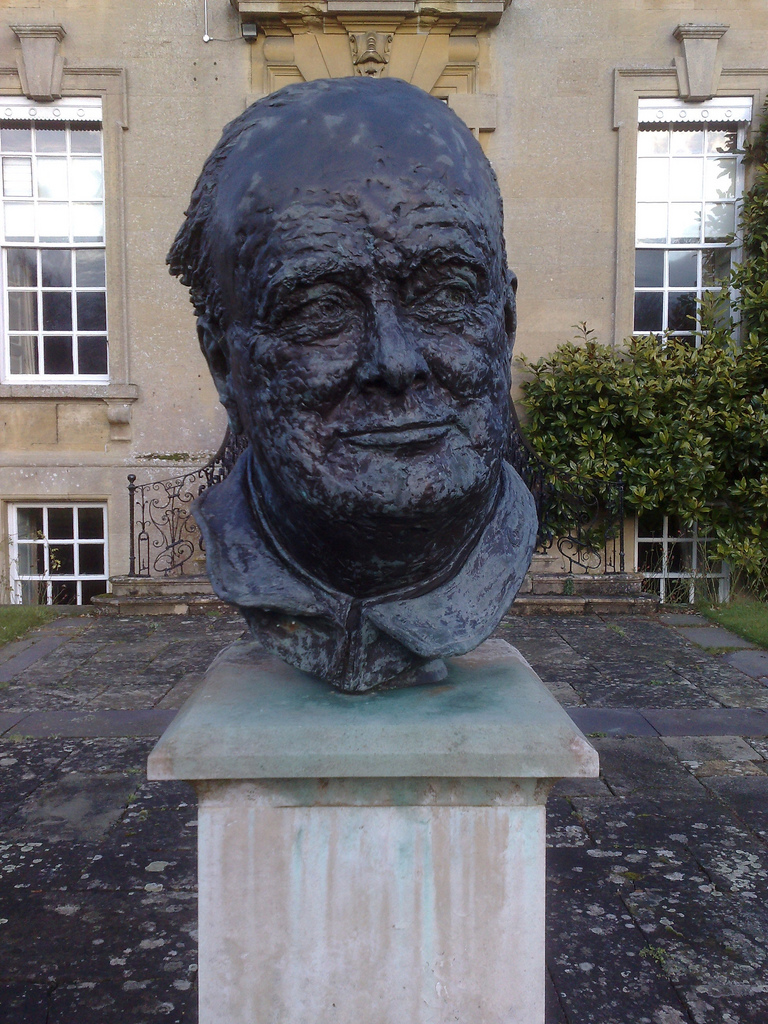
Bust of Winston Churchill on the terrace

== See also ==
- Ditchley Foundation
- Noble Households – book with Ditchley Park inventories of 1743 and 1772

== Sources ==
- Booth, Paul (1999). "Ralegh Radford and the Roman Villa at Ditchley: A Review". Oxoniensia. LXIV. Oxfordshire Architectural and Historical Society: 39–49.
- Brooks, Alan; Sherwood, Jennifer (2017). Oxfordshire. The Buildings Of England. New Haven, US and London: Yale University Press. ISBN 978-0-300-20930-3.
- Copeland, Tim (1988). "The North Oxfordshire Grim's Ditch: a Fieldwork Survey". Oxoniensia. LIII. Oxfordshire Architectural and Historical Society: 277–292.
- Emery, Frank (1974). The Oxfordshire Landscape. The Making of the English Landscape. London: Hodder & Stoughton. pp. 44, 124, 125, 127. ISBN 0-340-04301-6.
- Jenkins, Simon (2003). England's Thousand Best Houses. London, UK: Penguin Books. ISBN 978-0-7139-9596-1.
- Riley, D.N. (1943). "Archaeology from the Air in the Upper Thames Valley". Oxoniensia. VIII–IX. Oxford Architectural and Historical Society: 64–101.
- Sherwood, Jennifer; Pevsner, Nikolaus (1974). Oxfordshire. The Buildings of England. Harmondsworth: Penguin Books. pp. 572–576. ISBN 0-14-071045-0.
- Spens, Michael (1994). The Complete Landscape Designs and Gardens of Geoffrey Jellicoe. London: Thames & Hudson. ISBN 978-0-500-01596-4. OCLC 928039933.
- Sutherland, C.H.V. (1936). "A Late Roman Coin-Hoard from Kiddington, Oxon". Oxoniensia. I. Oxford Architectural and Historical Society: 70–80.
