= Barbara Palmer, 1st Duchess of Cleveland =

English royal mistress (1640–1709)

Her Grace The Duchess of Cleveland
- Countess of Castlemaine
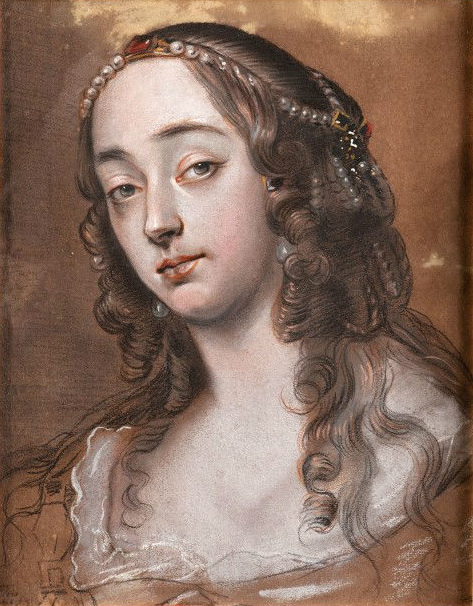
- Portrait attributed to John Greenhill. Dated to no later than 1676.
- Born: Barbara Villiers; 27 November 1640 (17 November Old Style); Parish of St. Margaret's, City and Liberty of Westminster, Middlesex, England
- Died: 9 October 1709 (aged 68); Chiswick Mall, Middlesex, England
- Noble family: Villiers
- Spouses: Roger Palmer, 1st Earl of Castlemaine; Robert Fielding
- Issue: Anne Lennard, Countess of Sussex; Charles FitzRoy, 2nd Duke of Cleveland; Henry FitzRoy, 1st Duke of Grafton; Charlotte Lee, Countess of Lichfield; George FitzRoy, 1st Duke of Northumberland; Barbara FitzRoy
- Parents: William Villiers, 2nd Viscount Grandison; Mary Bayning
- Occupation: Lady of the Bedchamber

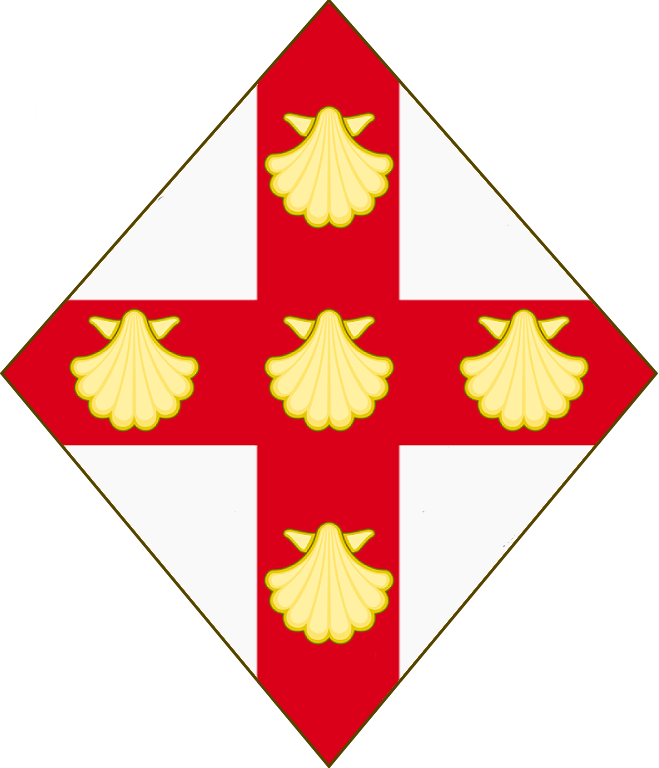
Arms of Barbara Villiers as the only daughter of William Villiers, 2nd Viscount Grandison: Argent on a cross Gules five escallops Or.

Barbara Palmer, 1st Duchess of Cleveland, Countess of Castlemaine (née Barbara Villiers /ˈvɪlərz/ VIL-ərz; 27 November [O.S. 17 November] 1640 – 9 October 1709), was an English royal mistress of the Villiers family and perhaps the most notorious of the many mistresses of King Charles II of England, by whom she had five children, all of them acknowledged and subsequently ennobled. Barbara was the subject of many portraits, in particular by court painter Sir Peter Lely.

Barbara's first cousin, Elizabeth Villiers (later 1st Countess of Orkney 1657–1733), was the presumed mistress of King William III. King William was the King of England, Scotland, and Ireland from 1689 to 1702.

== Early life ==
Born into the Villiers family as Barbara Villiers, in the parish of St Margaret's, Westminster, Middlesex, she was the only child of William Villiers, 2nd Viscount Grandison, a half-nephew of George Villiers, 1st Duke of Buckingham, and of his wife Mary Bayning, co-heiress of Paul Bayning, 1st Viscount Bayning. On 29 September 1643, her father died in the First English Civil War from a wound sustained on 26 July at the storming of Bristol, while leading a brigade of Cavaliers. He had spent his considerable fortune on horses and ammunition for a regiment he raised himself; his widow and daughter were left in straitened circumstances. Shortly after Lord Grandison's death, Barbara's mother next married Charles Villiers, 2nd Earl of Anglesey, a cousin of her late husband.

Upon the execution of Charles I in 1649, the impoverished Villiers family secretly transferred its loyalty to his son, Charles II. Every year on 29 May, the new King's birthday, young Barbara, along with her family, descended to the cellar of their home in total darkness and clandestinely drank to his health. At that time, Charles was living in The Hague, supported at first by his brother-in-law, Prince William II of Orange, and later by his nephew, William III of Orange.

== Marriage ==
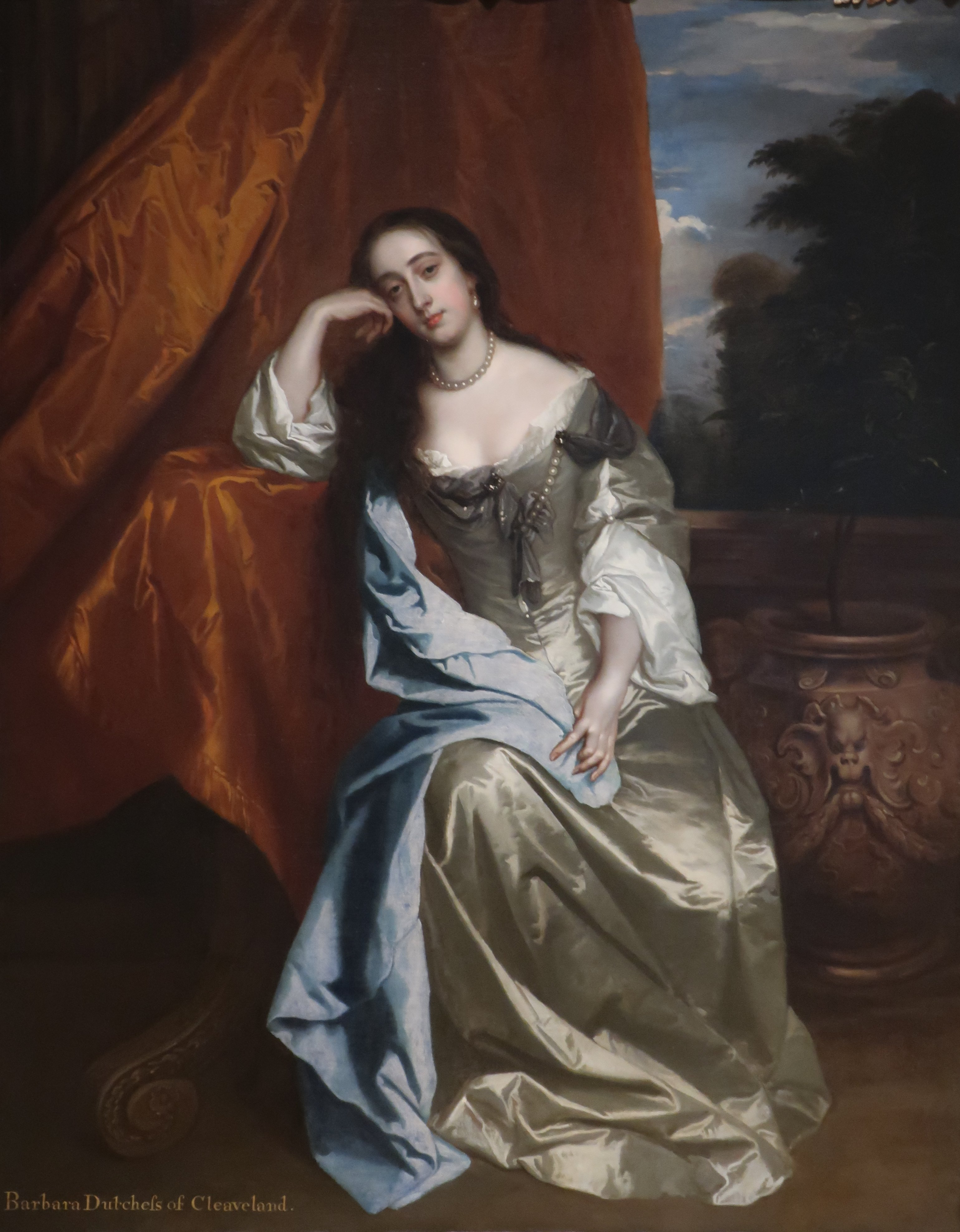
Barbara Palmer's lack of fortune limited her marriage prospects

Tall, voluptuous, with masses of dark brown hair, slanting, heavy-lidded violet eyes, alabaster skin, and a sensuous, sulky mouth, Barbara Villiers was considered one of the most beautiful of the Royalist women, but her lack of fortune left her with reduced marriage prospects. Her first serious romance was with Philip Stanhope, 2nd Earl of Chesterfield, but he was searching for a rich wife; he married Elizabeth Butler in 1660. On 14 April 1659, she married Roger Palmer (later 1st Earl of Castlemaine), a Roman Catholic, against his family's wishes; his father predicted that she would make him one of the most miserable men in the world. The Palmers had joined the ambitious group of supplicants who sailed for Brussels at the end of 1659. In 1660, Barbara became the King's mistress, and on 20 August 1660 was awarded two pennies seigniorage on every Troy pound of silver minted into coins. As a reward for her services, the King created her husband Baron Limerick and Earl of Castlemaine in 1661. These titles were given with the stipulation that they would be passed down only through Roger's heirs by Barbara, thereby serving as an indirect way for the King to secure an inheritance for his illegitimate children. The two officially separated in 1662, after the birth of her first son. It has been claimed that Roger, Lord Castlemaine, did not father any of his wife's children.

== Royal mistress ==
Lady Castlemaine's influence over the King waxed and waned throughout her tenure as royal mistress. At her height, her influence was so great that she has been called "The Uncrowned Queen", and she was known to assert her influence with the King over the actual Queen, Catherine of Braganza. This initially began upon the Queen's landing at Portsmouth. Samuel Pepys reported that the customary bonfire outside Lady Castlemaine's house was left conspicuously unlit for the Queen's arrival. In point of fact, Lady Castlemaine planned to give birth to her and Charles' second child at Hampton Court Palace while the royal couple were honeymooning.

Of her six children, five were acknowledged by Charles as his. Charles did not believe he sired the youngest, but he was coerced into legally owning paternity by Lady Castlemaine:

- Lady Anne Palmer, later FitzRoy (1661–1722), probably daughter of Charles II, although some believed she resembled the Earl of Chesterfield. She was claimed by Charles, Chesterfield and Palmer. She later became the Countess of Sussex.
- Charles Palmer, later FitzRoy (1662–1730), styled Lord Limerick and later Earl of Southampton, created Duke of Southampton (1675), later 2nd Duke of Cleveland (1709)
- Henry FitzRoy (1663–1690), created Earl of Euston (1672) and Duke of Grafton (1675)
- Charlotte FitzRoy (1664–1718), later Countess of Lichfield. She gave birth to at least 18 children.
- George FitzRoy (1665–1716), created Earl of Northumberland (1674) and Duke of Northumberland (1683)
- Barbara (Benedicta) FitzRoy (1672–1737) – Barbara Villiers claimed that she was Charles's daughter, but she was probably the child of her mother's second cousin and lover, John Churchill, later Duke of Marlborough

=== Lady of the Bedchamber ===
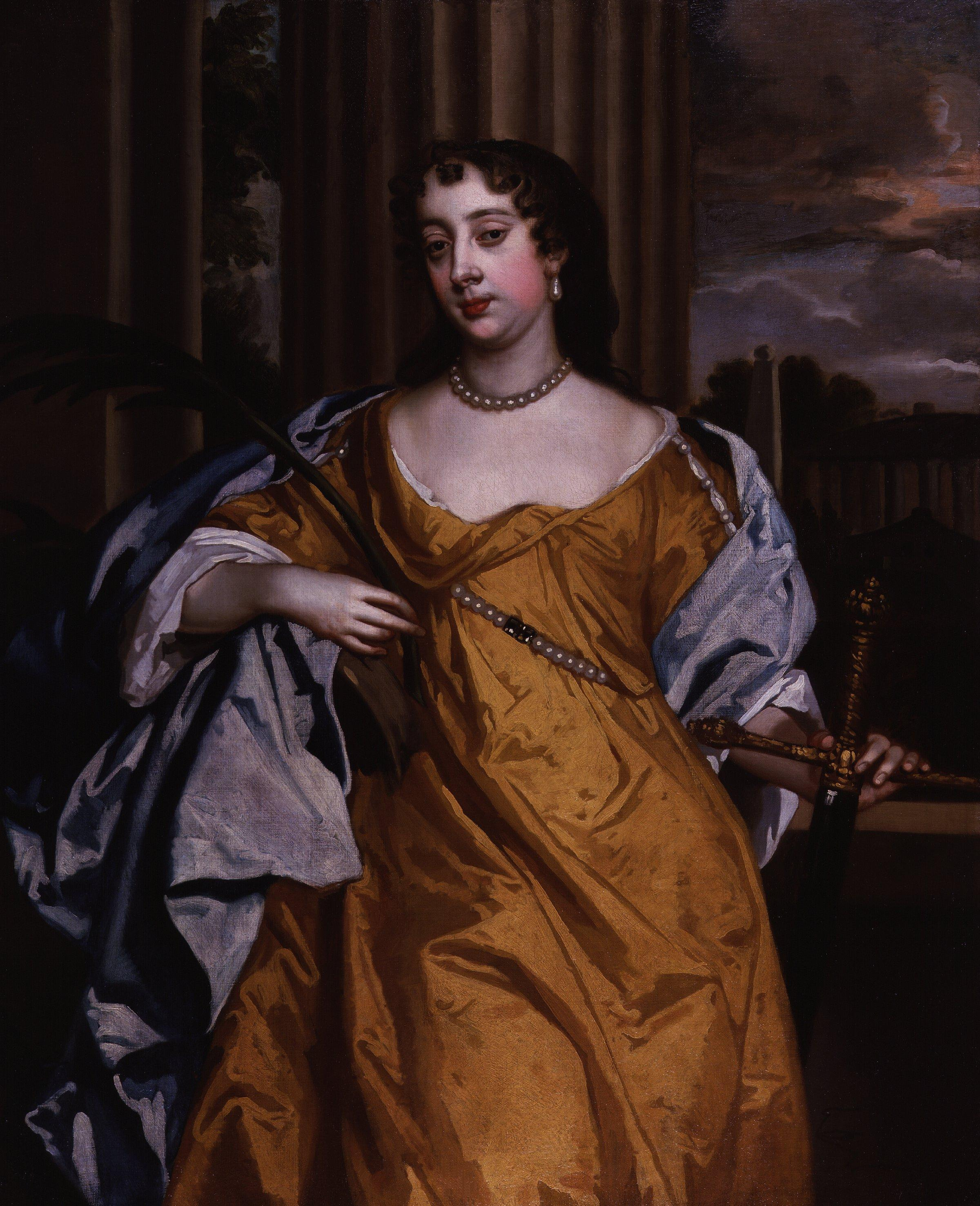
Portrait by Sir Peter Lely (c. 1666)

Upon her oldest son's birth in 1662, Barbara was appointed Lady of the Bedchamber despite opposition from Queen Catherine and Edward Hyde, 1st Earl of Clarendon, chief advisor to the King and a bitter enemy of Lady Castlemaine. Behind closed doors, Barbara and the Queen feuded constantly.

Her victory in being appointed Lady of the Bedchamber was followed by rumours of an estrangement between her and the King, the result of his infatuation with Frances Stuart. In December 1663, Lady Castlemaine announced her conversion from Anglicanism to Roman Catholicism. Historians disagree as to why she did so. Some believe it was an attempt to consolidate her position with the King, and some believe it was a way to strengthen her ties with her Catholic husband. The King treated the matter lightly, saying that he was interested in ladies' bodies but not their souls. The Court was equally flippant, the general view being that the Church of Rome had gained nothing by her conversion, and the Church of England had lost nothing.

In June 1670, Charles created her Baroness Nonsuch (as she was the owner of Nonsuch Palace). She was also briefly granted ownership of the Phoenix Park in Dublin as a present from the King. She was made Duchess of Cleveland in her own right, but no one at court knew whether this was an indication that she was being jettisoned by Charles or a sign that she was even higher in his favours. The dukedom was made with a special remainder that allowed it to be passed to her eldest son, Charles FitzRoy, despite his illegitimacy.

King Charles II took lower-status lovers, in particular actress Nell Gwynne, who is commonly romanticised as an orange seller. So did Barbara, who built up a reputation for promiscuity; her daughter Barbara Fitzroy, born in 1672, is believed to have been fathered by her second cousin John Churchill, who built Blenheim Palace later in life.

== Character ==
Lady Castlemaine was known for her dual nature. She was famously extravagant and promiscuous, with a renowned temper that often turned on the King when she was displeased. Diarist John Evelyn called her "the curse of the nation". She influenced the King in her position as royal mistress and helped herself to money from the Privy Purse as well as taking bribes from the Spanish and the French, in addition to her sizable allowance from the King.

She also participated in politics, combining with the future Cabal ministry to bring about Lord Clarendon's downfall. On his dismissal in August 1667, Lady Castlemaine publicly mocked him; Clarendon gently reminded her that if she lived, one day she too would be old. There are also accounts of exceptional kindness from Lady Castlemaine; once, after a scaffold had fallen onto a crowd of people at the theatre, she rushed to assist an injured child, the only court lady to do so. Others described her as great fun, keeping a good table and with a heart to match her famous temper.

== Downfall ==
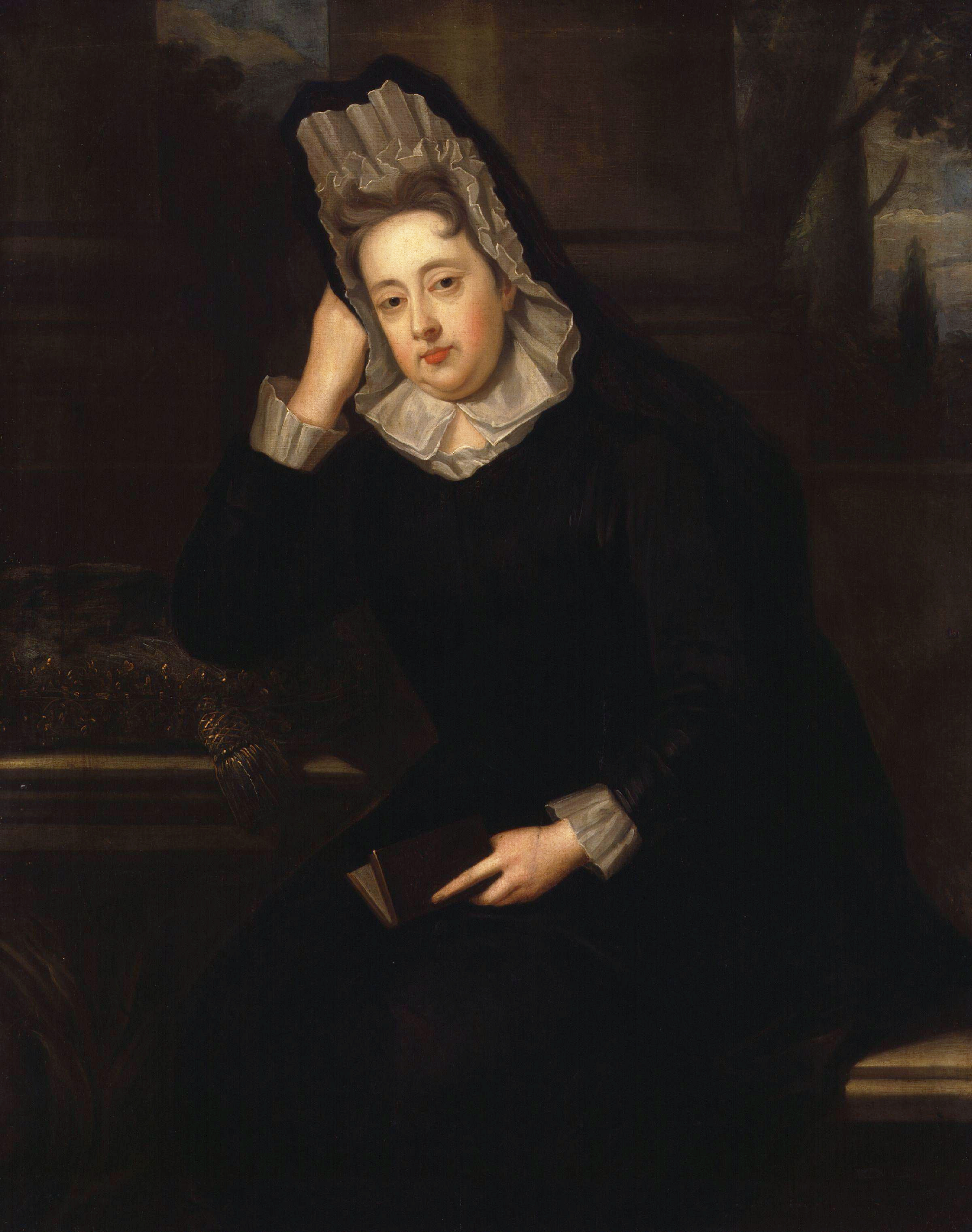
Barbara, Duchess of Cleveland, circa 1705, by Sir Godfrey Kneller

The King took other mistresses, most notably the actress Nell Gwynne. Later in their relationship, the Duchess of Cleveland took other lovers too, including the acrobat Jacob Hall, Henry Jermyn, 1st Baron Dover and her second cousin John Churchill. Her lovers benefited financially from the arrangement; Churchill purchased an annuity with £5,000 she gave him. The King, who was no longer troubled by the Duchess's infidelity, was much amused when he heard about the annuity, saying that after all a young man must have something to live on. Her open promiscuity and extravagant spending made her a popular figure for satirists to use to indirectly ridicule the King and his court, which made her position as royal mistress all the more precarious. In 1670 Charles II gave her the famed Nonsuch Palace. As the result of the 1673 Test Act, which essentially banned Catholics from holding office, she lost her position as Lady of the Bedchamber, and the King cast her aside completely from her position as a mistress, taking Louise de Kérouaille as his newest "favourite" royal mistress. The King advised his former mistress to live quietly and cause no scandal, in which case he "cared not whom she loved".

In 1676, the Duchess travelled to Paris with her four youngest children. She returned to England four years later. Her extravagant tastes never abated, and between 1682 and 1683 she had Nonsuch Palace pulled down and sold off the building materials to pay gambling debts. She eventually reconciled with the King, who was seen enjoying an evening in her company a week before he died in February 1685. After his death, the 45-year-old Duchess began an affair with Cardonell Goodman, an actor of terrible reputation, and in March 1686 gave birth to his child, a son.

=== Second marriage ===
In 1705, Lord Castlemaine died, and she married Major-General Robert Fielding, an unscrupulous fortune-hunter whom she prosecuted for bigamy after she discovered that he had married Mary Wadsworth, in the mistaken belief that she was an heiress, just a fortnight before he married Barbara. She had complained of his "barbarous ill-treatment" of her after she stopped his allowance, and was eventually forced to summon the magistrates for protection.

=== Death ===
Barbara died at age 68 on 9 October 1709 at her home, Walpole House on Chiswick Mall, after suffering from dropsy, now described as oedema of the legs, with congestive heart failure.

== Cultural depictions ==
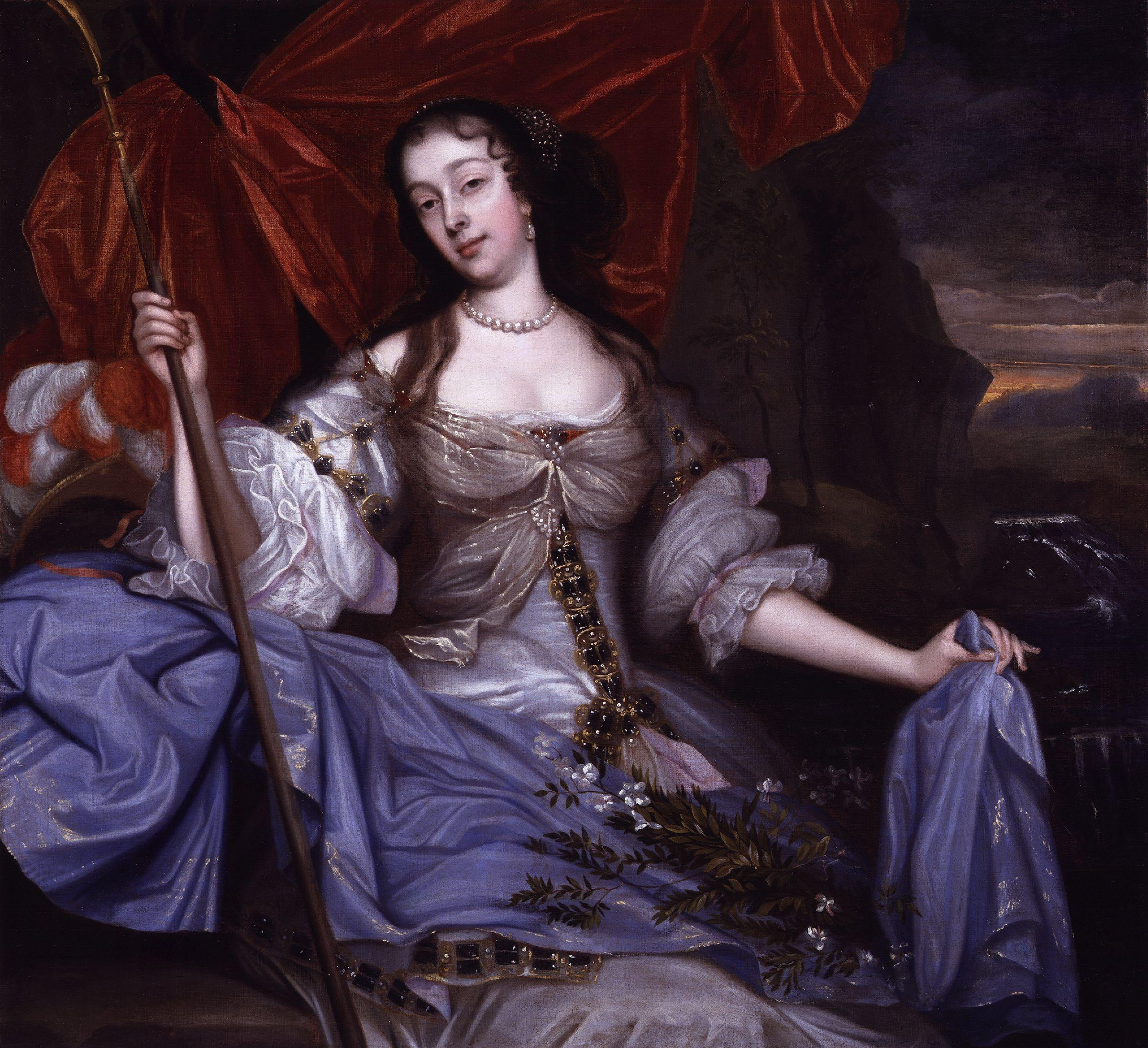
Barbara Palmer is often featured as a character in literature.

=== Theatre ===
Barbara Villiers figures prominently in George Bernard Shaw's In Good King Charles's Golden Days (1939) and Jessica Swale's Nell Gwynn (2015), played in the premiere productions by Daphne Heard and Sasha Waddell respectively.

=== Novels ===
Villiers is the protagonist in the following literary fiction novels:

- Royal Mistress (1977) by Patricia Campbell Horton
- Royal Harlot (2007) by Susan Holloway Scott
- A Health Unto His Majesty (1956) by Jean Plaidy
- The Sceptre and the Rose (1967) by Doris Leslie

She is a recurring character in Susanna Gregory's Thomas Chaloner series of mystery novels and features as an antagonist to Amber St. Clare, the protagonist in Forever Amber (1944) by Kathleen Winsor.

=== Film ===
Barbara is played:

- In the 1911 film Sweet Nell of Old Drury by Agnes Keogh
- In the 1922 film The Glorious Adventure by Elizabeth Beerbohm
- In the 1926 film Nell Gwyn by Juliette Compton
- In the 1934 film Colonel Blood by Anne Grey
- In the 1947 film Forever Amber by Natalie Draper (actress)
- In the 1989 film The Lady and the Highwayman by Emma Samms
- In the 1995 film England, My England by Letitia Dean
- In the 2009 film Broadside by Antonia Kinlay

=== Television ===
Barbara is played:

- In the 1958 miniseries The Diary of Samuel Pepys by Diana Fairfax
- In the 1969 miniseries The First Churchills by Moira Redmond
- In the 1974 TV series Churchill's People by Diana Rayworth
- In the 2003 miniseries Charles II: The Power & The Passion by Helen McCrory
- In the 2014 miniseries The Great Fire by Susannah Fielding

== Notes ==
Peerage of England
New creation	Duchess of Cleveland; 1st creation 1670–1709	Succeeded by Charles Fitzroy
