= Richard Brewer (soldier) =

English army officer

Richard Brewer was an English army officer of the seventeenth century. In 1688, Brewer took part in the Army Plot against James II during the Glorious Revolution.

== Early career ==
A professional soldier, he served with other British volunteers in the French Army during the 1670s before transferring to the English Army. He may have served with the Tangier Garrison along with many other prominent soldiers of the era.

During the Glorious Revolution of 1688, Brewer endorsed the new regime of William III. He was closely associated with a number of fellow officers who changed sides, abandoning their allegiance to James II.

== Irish war ==
During the Williamite War in Ireland, he served with an infantry regiment under the command of Henry Wharton. Wharton's Regiment landed with a major expedition under Marshal Schomberg near Belfast and captured Carrickfergus. However the Army became bogged down at Dundalk Camp, losing thousands to disease. Wharton himself died of fever and as his lieutenant colonel, Brewer was promoted to command the regiment.

He led it in action at the Battle of the Boyne the following year. In 1691, the regiment served during the Aughrim campaign and the decisive Siege of Limerick which ended the war with the Jacobite Irish Army surrendering. The regiment then transferred to continental Europe to take part in King William's War against France.

== Later career ==
In 1692, Brewer was identified as being part of a group of officers who were reportedly prepared to switch sides and assist a restoration of James II to the throne. Ironically many of these officers were those such as John Lanier and Charles Churchill who had previously actively supported William during the Glorious Revolution. The warning was issued during the height of an invasion scare. Nonetheless, Brewer continued in command of his regiment until 1702. A later posting was as commander of the troops stationed in Jamaica.

== Bibliography ==
- Childs, John. The Williamite War in Ireland, 1688-1691. Continuum, 2007.
- Cruickshanks, Eveline. The Stuart Court in Exile and the Jacobites. A&C Black, 1995.
- Webb, Stephen. Marlborough's America. Yale University Press, 2013.

Military offices
| Preceded by Henry Wharton | Colonel of Brewer's Regiment of Foot; 1689–1702 | Succeeded by John Livesay |
