= 11th (Service) Battalion, Suffolk Regiment (Cambridgeshire) =

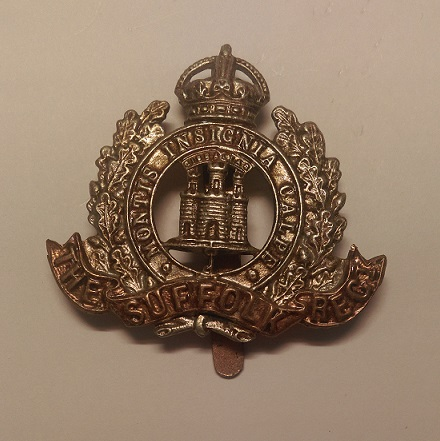
- Cap badge of the Suffolk Regiment
- Active: 25 September 1914–9 December 1919
- Allegiance: United Kingdom
- Branch: New Army
- Type: Pals battalion
- Role: Infantry
- Size: One Battalion
- Part of: 34th Division; 61st (2nd South Midland) Division
- Garrison/HQ: Cambridge
- Nickname: 'Cambs Kitcheners'
- Patron: Territorial Force Association of the County of Cambridge and the Isle of Ely
- Engagements: Battle of the Somme; Battle of Arras; Hargicourt; German spring offensive Battle of the Lys; Battle of the Selle

The 11th (Service) Battalion, Suffolk Regiment (Cambridgeshire) was a 'Pals battalion' raised in Cambridgeshire and the Isle of Ely for 'Kitchener's Army' in World War I. It served on the Western Front from January 1916 until the Armistice, seeing action at the Somme – where it was virtually destroyed on the first day – Arras, Ypres, against the German spring offensive when it defended Henin Hill, in the Battle of the Lys and the final Battle of the Selle.

== Recruitment ==
Alfred Leete's recruitment poster for Kitchener's Army.

On 6 August 1914, less than 48 hours after Britain's declaration of war, Parliament sanctioned an increase of 500,000 men for the Regular British Army. The newly appointed Secretary of State for War, Earl Kitchener of Khartoum, issued his famous call to arms: 'Your King and Country Need You', urging the first 100,000 volunteers to come forward. This group of six divisions with supporting arms became known as Kitchener's First New Army, or 'K1'. The K2, K3 and K4 battalions, brigades and divisions followed soon afterwards. But the flood of volunteers overwhelmed the ability of the Army to absorb them. When the Fifth New Army (K5) was authorised on 10 December 1914 many of its units had already been raised by local initiative rather than at regimental depots, often from men from particular localities or backgrounds who wished to serve together: these were known as 'Pals battalions'. In parallel, the county Territorial Associations, which administered the prewar voluntary Territorial Force (TF), had also been dealing with a surge in recruitment. Unusually, the Cambridgeshire and Isle of Ely TF Association was asked by the War Office (WO) to deal with the excess 'K' recruits from their county, who could not be handled by the nearest Regular regimental deport (the Suffolk Regiment at Bury St Edmunds). This was in addition to recruiting and equipping an extra battalion of the county's TF regiment (the Cambridgeshire Regiment). Under the leadership of Charles Adeane, the TF Association took on the additional burden. From 5 September, 'K' recruits from the county were retained at Cambridge instead of being sent to Bury; they were billeted at the Corn Exchange and fed under local arrangements. Within days the numbers had swelled to over 300 and the men were moved to the boys' county school. They were temporarily commanded by Colonel C.T. Heycock of the Cambridgeshire Regiment, assisted by cadets from the Cambridge University Officers' Training Corps (CUOTC) who were awaiting their officers' commissions. Second Lieutenant Gerald Tuck of the CUOTC acted as adjutant. Training began on Parker's Piece in the town centre. Recruitment continued strongly, encouraged by the Ladies' Recruiting Committee headed by Mrs Adeane. The response was so good that the TF Association proposed forming a complete local battalion, and on 25 September the WO accepted the Cambridgeshire Service Battalion. Until it was assigned to the Suffolks as 11th (Service) Battalion, Suffolk Regiment (Cambridgeshire) three months later, the battalion was often referred to as the 'Cambs Kitcheners'.

== Training ==
On 30 September the battalion moved to the Melbourne Place Schools in Cambridge, and Lieutenant-Colonel Charles Wyndham Somerset of the Indian Army (Note: Formerly of the 48th Pioneers, Lt-Col Somerset had seen active service in Burma and on the North West Frontier, including the Chitral Expedition and the Tirah Campaign.) arrived to take command, allowing Col Heycock to assume command of the second battalion of the TF regiment. Most of the junior officers initially appointed to the battalion came from the CUOTC. As with all the Kitchener units, training was hindered by the lack of uniforms, equipment and instructors, though the Cambridgeshire TF Association was able to source many items, including blue serge uniforms. On 18 December the battalion moved to a hutted camp at Cherry Hinton on the edge of the town. It had now reached its full establishment, but the WO required it to form an additional reserve company, bringing the new establishment up to 1350, which was completed in January 1915; later a second reserve company was formed. Shortages began to be made up, though when King George V inspected all the troops training in the Cambridge area at Parker's Piece on 11 February 1915, the 11th Suffolks were still wearing blue rather than khaki greatcoats.

The battalion left Cambridge on 19 June 1915 to join 34th Division, which was assembling round Ripon in North Yorkshire. The 11th Suffolks camped at Fountains Abbey where it was brigaded with the 1st and 2nd Edinburgh Pals battalions (15th and 16th (S) Bns Royal Scots, the 2nd Edinburgh being known as McCrae's Battalion) and the Grimsby Chums (11th (S) Bn Lincolnshire Regiment) in 101st Brigade. The other two brigades were the 102nd (Tyneside Scottish) and 103rd (Tyneside Irish), formed of battalions of the Northumberland Fusiliers. After training on the moors of North Yorkshire, 34th Division proceeded to Salisbury Plain in late August for final intensive training, with the 11th Suffolks at Perham Down Camp, later at Warminster.

On 13 December 34th Division was ordered to mobilise for service in Egypt, but these orders were rescinded on 26 December and instead the division embarked for France to join the British Expeditionary Force (BEF) fighting on the Western Front. Entrainment for the embarkation ports began on 7 January 1916 and the 11th Suffolks landed at Boulogne on 9 January. The division completed its concentration around La Crosse (east of Saint-Omer) on 15 January.

=== 13th (Reserve) Battalion ===
When the 11th Bn moved to Fountains Abbey in May 1915 it left behind at Cherry Hinton Camp the two reserve companies, totalling 17 officers and 320 other ranks (ORs). On 9 June these became 13th (Reserve) Battalion, Suffolk Regiment (Cambridgeshire), with the task of training reinforcement drafts for the service battalion. Major A.W. Stanley, the 11th (S) Bn's original second-in-command, was promoted to lieutenant-colonel to command the reserve battalion. On 9 November the 13th (R) Bn, now over 400 strong, moved to billets in Trowbridge, Wiltshire, to join the 24th Reserve Brigade, but the following February it was transferred to the 26th Reserve Brigade at Leamington Spa in Warwickshire. On 14 April 1916 the battalion was sent to Abbey Wood, south east of London, where it was quartered in huts in Lesnes Park, and at the end of July to Chohole Gate Camp in Richmond Park. At this time its strength had increased to well over 800. By September it had sent 700 men in drafts to the service battalion to replace its losses at the Somme.

On 1 September 1916 the Training Reserve (TR) was established following the introduction of conscription, and 13th (R) Bn became 108th Training Reserve Battalion, transferring 300 men to the 3rd (R) Bn, Suffolk Regiment, at Felixstowe. On 10 October 1916 the 108th TR Bn became a reserve garrison battalion, taking in 900 men of 'B1' medical category and distributing all its 'A' category men among the other battalions of 26th Reserve Bde. 108th TR Battalion left Richmond Park on 2 November for nearby Barnes, where from 1 January 1917 about 1000 men were billeted in the stables of the Ranelagh Club, the remainder in the town. In July the battalion went into camp at Bocking, near Sittingbourne, Kent, where it became part of the Thames and Medway Garrison. Two months later it was transferred to Maida Barracks at Aldershot, where it was disbanded on 20 February 1918.

== Service ==
The commander of 101st Bde, Brigadier- General H.G. Fitton, was mortally wounded during a reconnaissance of the front line on 18 January, and Col Somerset of 11th Suffolks had to deputise until 28 January 1916. On 23 January 34th Division went into reserve behind III Corps, with 101st Bde around Morbecque. Parties were then sent into the line with 23rd Division near Erquinghem in the Armentières sector to learn the routines of Trench warfare; 11th Suffolks went up from 2 to 7 February, suffering its first casualties. On 21 February the division took over its own sector of the front line, with 101st Bde on the right, at the dangerous Bridoux salient, overlooked by the German positions on Radinghem Ridge. Because of the high water table the trenches were shallow, built up with breastworks. Over the following weeks the brigades were rotated between the frontline trenches and reserve. Most of April was spent in divisional training, then on 5 May the battalion entrained for the Somme sector where the BEF was preparing for that summer's 'Big Push' (the Battle of the Somme). 11th Suffolks were in reserve, then in support, and on 21 May went into the line on the division's right, facing the fortified ruins of La Boisselle. It then began periods of 6 days in the line alternating with 4 days of rest, until it went into camp behind Albert on 23 June.

=== First day on the Somme ===
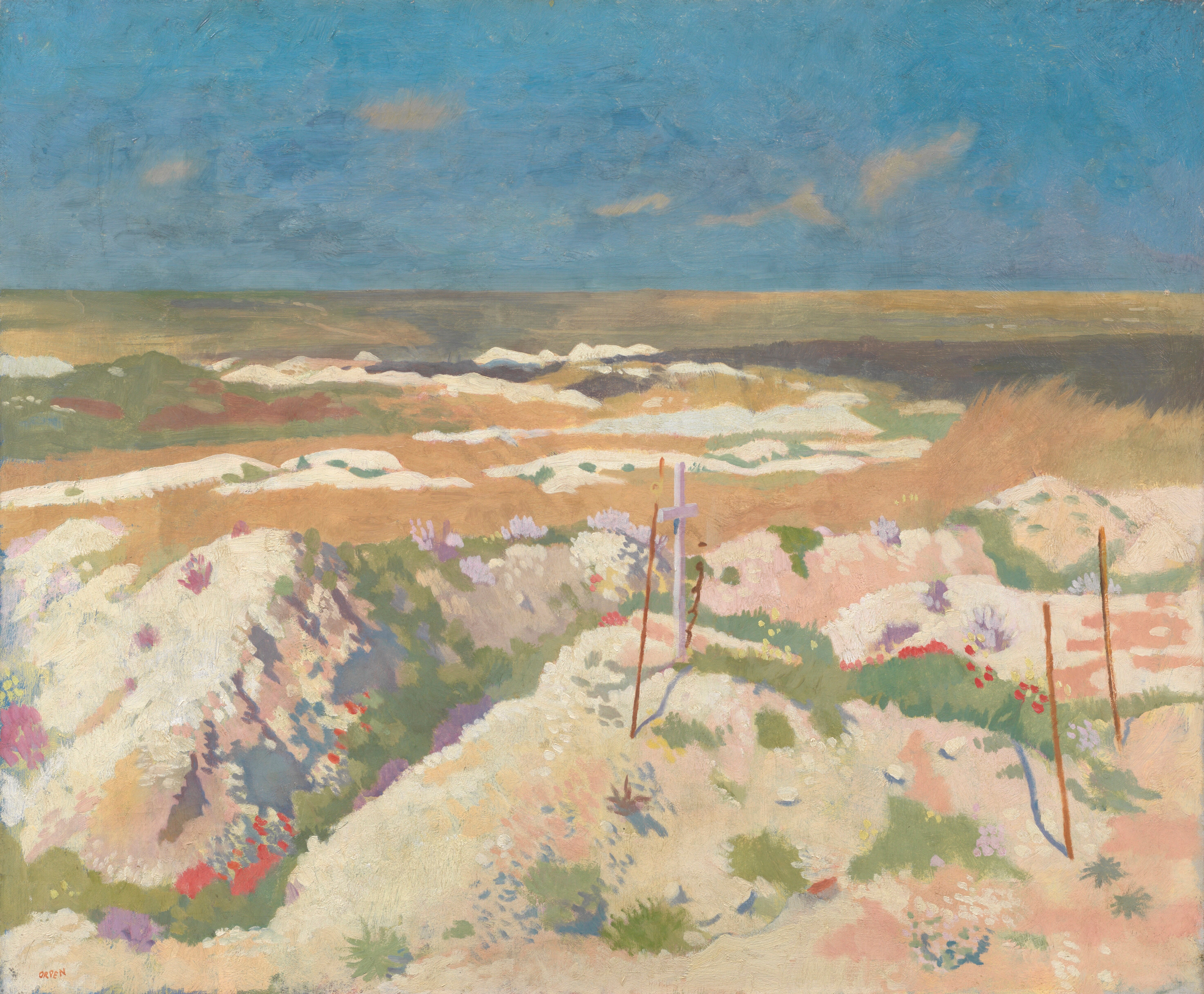
A Grave and a Mine Crater at La Boisselle, by William Orpen.

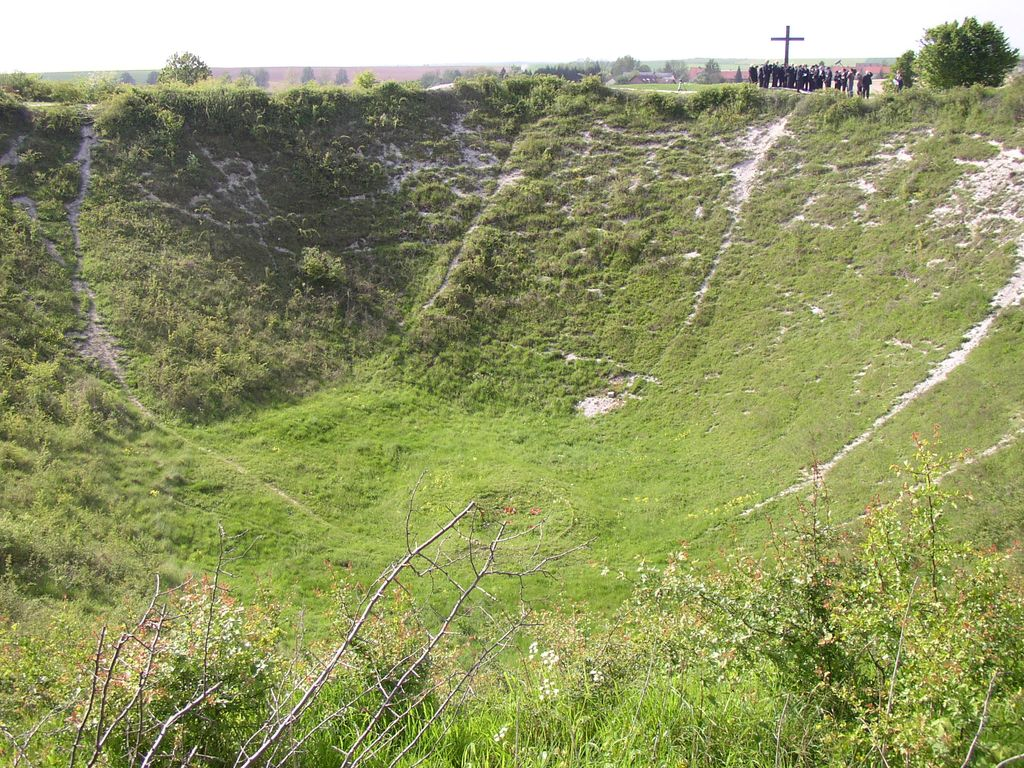
Lochnagar Crater, present day.

The First day on the Somme was the first offensive operation for 34th Division. Attacking on the right of III Corps, its objectives (recognised as being ambitious) were the Capture of La Boisselle and an advance of 3,500 yards (3,200 m) almost to Contalmaison, crossing six successive trench lines. The bombardment began on 25 June and on 27 June the 11th Suffolks moved up close behind the line, two companies in Bécourt Wood and the others in dugouts on the Tara-Usna Ridge. However bad weather hindered artillery observation so the bombardment was extended by two days and the attack was postponed until 1 July. The battalions moved into their assembly trenches between 05.00 and 07.00 as the artillery began their final bombardment. 34th Division was to attack with 102nd Bde on the left, 101st on the right, each brigade forming two columns. 101st Brigade's left hand column consisted of the 10th Lincolns in the first wave, followed by the 11th Suffolks to pass through and capture the second objective, 2,000 yards (1,800 m) ahead, then a following battalion of 103rd (Tyneside Irish) Bde to go on to the final objective. The brigade's line of attack ran up 'Sausage Valley', overlooked to the north by the Schwabenhöhe fortification outside La Boisselle and to the south by the Heligoland strongpoint (known as 'Sausage Redoubt' to the British) projecting into No man's land, with 'Scots Redoubt' on the Fricourt Ridge behind it. However, the 179th Tunnelling Company, Royal Engineers, had placed a huge mine under the Schwabenhöhe (the Lochnagar mine), which was fired at 07.28, 2 minutes before Zero. This obliterated a section of the German defences and created a very large crater. All three waves of the attacking columns went 'over the top' on time, at 07.30 for 101st Bde's right hand column, at 07.35 for the left column including 11th Suffolks, to allow the mine debris to settle (a few casualties were suffered from falling blocks of chalk).

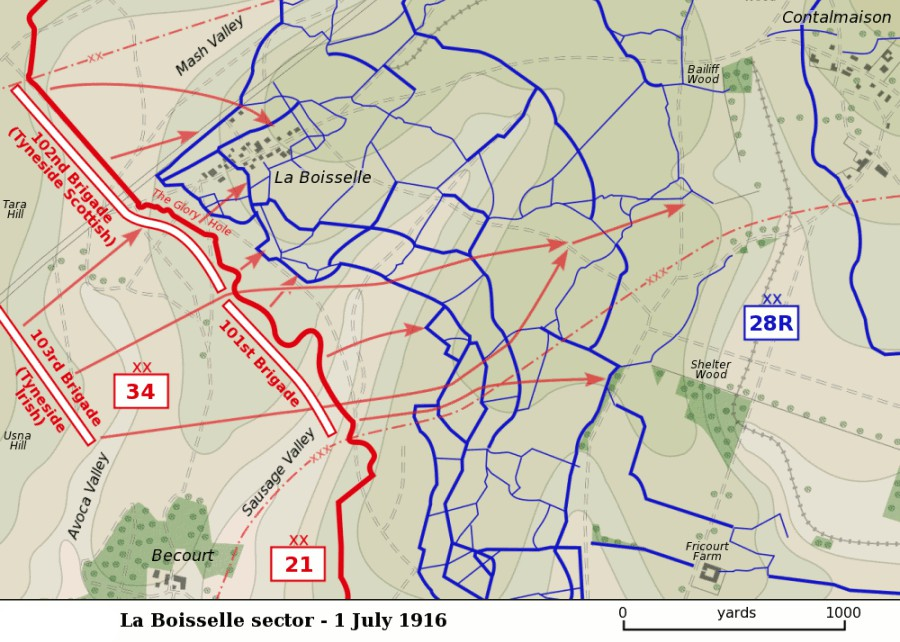
34th Division's attack on Sausage Valley, 1 July 1916.

The attack was a disaster. The German defences had not been suppressed by the long bombardment, and although some of the 10th Lincolns were able to rush forward and occupy Lochnagar crater before the Germans, they and the 11th Suffolks following them up Sausage Valley were shot down by German machine gun teams who came out of their deep dugouts as soon as the British barrage lifted. Many of the following waves suffered heavy casualties before they had even crossed the British front line. The 11th Suffolks was also hit by a weak counter-barrage that the Germans put down on the British front line. The 10th Lincolns and 11th Suffolks had 500 yards (460 m) of open ground to cross before they reached the main German line, and the waves were soon reduced to small groups of men. The Official History estimated that the leading battalions lost 80 per cent of their men in the first 10 minutes. The survivors took what cover they could on the open fire-swept zone, which the Germans worked over systematically with shellfire and machine guns, as they did with the new crater. The carrying parties with ammunition and bombs were unable to cross. The following 1st Tyneside Irish (24th Northumberland Fusiliers) were ordered to halt once they reached the old British line rather than be thrown away in the same way. Nevertheless, some men of 11th Suffolks found themselves caught up in the attack on Sausage Redoubt to the right. Here the 15th and 16th Royal Scots had passed the strongpoint, leaving a detachment to 'mop up'; they were unable to do so and the German machine guns continued firing into Sausage Valley. The Royal Scots reached the German second intermediate line, but were then driven back to 'Wood Lane', where a group was joined by men of their support battalion, 4th Tyneside Irish (27th Northumberland Fusiliers), some Lincolns and a 14-man party of the 11th Suffolks under Capt Osbert Brown. Although wounded, Capt Brown took command of this group and held out all day, guarding the left flank of the neighbouring 21st Division.

That evening Lt-Col Sir George McCrae of 16th Royal Scots was sent forward to organise all the troops of 34th Division in this part of the battlefield (now about 300 men in Wood Lane), After dark parties of the divisional pioneer battalion (18th Northumberland Fusiliers (1st Tyneside Pioneers)) and Royal Engineers got across No man's land with water and ammunition, and helped to improve the defences. By morning McCrae had received about 400 reinforcements from 101st and 103rd Bdes, including about 140 of the 11th Suffolks under Lt W.M. Fiddian. During 2 July these parties completed the capture of Scots and Sausage Redoubts. The division was withdrawn on the night of 3/4 July. After they had rested in Becourt Wood, Brown led the men of 11th Suffolks back to camp in Long Valley, riding at their head on 'Eliza', a half-blind mare, to the cheers of his men.

The 34th Division suffered more infantry casualties than any other division on 1 July 1916. Although popular history pays most attention to the Tyneside Scottish and Tyneside Irish battalions, which were shattered, 11th Suffolks actually reported the highest casualty list of any battalion in the division for 1–3 July: 691. Of these only 6 were confirmed killed, but most of the 281 missing were in fact dead. It was later determined that 188 men of the battalion had been killed on the first day, rising to 215 including those fatally wounded. All four battalion commanders of 102nd Bde were killed, and three out of four in 103rd Bde became casualties, but Brig-Gen Robert Gore of 101st Bde had ordered his COs to stand fast with their battalion HQs when their men advanced, so that Lt-Col McCrae was able to reorganise the attack and Lt-Col Somerset was available to reorganise his men after the attack.

Although 34th Division went back into the line on 10 July, it was with two infantry brigades borrowed from another division, only 101st of its own brigades remaining throughout. However 101st Bde missed the Battle of Bazentin Ridge (14–7 July) because it had not sufficiently recovered for offensive action and it stayed in Hénencourt Wood refitting. 11th Suffolks' second-in-command, Maj W.A. Farquhar, was sent to command the 1st Tyneside Scottish and the adjutant, Capt Tuck, was promoted to succeed him. The battalion received 13 new officers and 520 ORs between 6 and 30 July, some from 13th Suffolks but also from other regiments, and now including 'Derby men' with only three months' training.

=== Pozières ===
On 30 July 11th Suffolks marched back to Becourt Wood and next day returned to the line at Bazentin-le-Petit. The Battle of Pozières Ridge was just beginning, and III Corps was attacking towards High Wood. A and B companies of 11th Suffolks were ordered to attack the Germans in 'Intermediate Trench' about 150 yards (140 m) in front. The attack was made at 01.10 on 4 August, supported by a short intense bombardment. B Company under Capt Osbert Brown got into the trench easily and began bombing along it, but A Company (and the two attacking companies of 16th Royal Scots who were aligned on 11th Suffolks) had failed to get into position and did not leave their trenches under the German counter-barrage. 16th Royal Scots tried again at 04.45, but it was getting light and they only advanced 30 yards (27 m) before being pinned down. Similarly, the pioneers were unable to make much progress in digging a communication trench across No man's land to Intermediate Trench. Isolated, B Company was ordered to withdraw after 4 hours in the trench, having suffered around 100 casualties, particularly among the specialist bombers. Osbert Brown was awarded the Distinguished Service Order (DSO); the commander of A Company was transferred out of the battalion. The following evening 50 volunteer bombers of 11th Suffolks went up to assist 15th Royal Scots in an attack, but this failed and the party lost 23 men. The battalion was relieved on the evening of 6 August; this was carried out under shellfire. 11th Suffolks returned to the Support Line on 10 August, and suffered further casualties from heavy shellfire on 12 August

On 15 August 34th Division left the Somme and marched back to the Armentières sector, where it spent the rest of the year routinely holding the line at Bois-Grenier, with regular trench raids. Colonel Somerset was invalided on 3 September and Maj Tuck took temporary command of 11th Suffolks until 4 October when Maj E.H. Kendrick of the Royal Dublin Fusiliers was promoted to become the CO. Reverting to second-in-command, Maj Tuck began training a specialist raiding party, which carried out a carefully-planned raid with artillery support on 12 October (a 'silent raid' having been aborted the previous night because the medium trench mortars had not cut the enemy wire). After a 3-minute barrage to cut the wire and cover the raiders, the artillery shifted to firing a Box barrage to isolate the section of German trench while the raiders did their work. After 8 minutes they returned with a wounded prisoner, covered by machine guns positioned in No man's land. The rest of the year was quiet for 11th Suffolks, though Capt Osbert Brown was killed by a stray bullet on 1 November.

=== Arras ===
On 26 January 1917 the division was suddenly rushed from Armentières to go into reserve at Méteren in case the Germans attacked over the now-frozen marshes north of Boezinge. This did not happen, but the division underwent three weeks' training there for the forthcoming offensive before moving to the Arras sector to continue preparations. 11th Suffolks went into its assembly positions south of Roclincourt on 8 April. The First Battle of the Scarpe launched the Arras Offensive at 05.30 next morning. The 11th Suffolks, attacking with 20 officers and 600 ORs, was leading 101st Bde alongside 16th Royal Scots. Neither battalion had any difficulty reaching the first objective (the Black Line) behind the creeping barrage, A Company of 11th Suffolks reporting that they gained it without loss. In fact, the two leading battalions had slightly overrun their objective, and in avoiding the German counter-barrage the 15th Royal Scots in support had come forward too soon and were intermingled with them, so they moved on to the second objective (the Blue Line along the Arras–Lille railway) without reorganising. This was also taken easily and 11th Suffolks stopped to consolidate while 15th Royal Scots went forward in disorganised fashion. but still took the third objective (the Brown Line) on time. There were signs of hasty flight in the German dugouts, and the orderly room sergeant and five battalion runners of 11th Suffolks secured some 20 prisoners. There was little in front of 101st Bde, and it is possible that it could have captured Gavrelle in the far distance had it pressed on regardless. That evening 11th Suffolks were sent up to support 27th Northumberland Fusiliers, but the enemy counter-attack had been driven off before they arrived. As the brigade secured its position over the following days amidst snowstorms it was subjected to heavy shelling, including gas shells. 11th Suffolks moved back to billets in Arras on 14 April, having lost about 150 casualties over the five days.

=== Rœux ===
After resting in billets the battalion returned to Arras while the Second Battle of the Scarpe was being fought. During the evening of 23 April it took up position in the railway cutting of the Blue Line of 9 April and next day 34th Division relieved 51st (Highland) Division. 11th Suffolks marched along the towpath to Athies, and then by the railway cutting to a position facing the chemical works at Rœux, which 51st (H) Division had failed to capture on 23 April. On the evening of 25 April the support line was heavily bombarded, especially around Battalion HQ, and Maj Tuck had to take command when Lt-Col Kendrick was evacuated, sick. The following night the battalion moved forward to the front line, and on 28 April attacked towards the chemical works as part of the Battle of Arleux. It formed the left-hand part of 101st Bde's attack, with a company of 16th Royal Scots attached as 'moppers-up', and Zero hour was 04.27. Because of the difficulty of following a creeping barrage through the buildings of Rœux, the barrage on 34th Division's front would advance in a series of timed lifts. However, the barrage was less accurate than on 9 April and one trench in front of Rœux was not touched at all. The left hand company was driven back to its start line by machine gun fire from this trench, and the other two leading companies got held up in heavy fighting in the chateau grounds. A Company in support passed through them, but part got cut off by Germans emerging from a tunnel in its rear, the company commander and his HQ being pinned down in a shellhole and forced to surrender when their ammunition ran out. Major Tuck went forward and found 5 officers and about 300 ORs in the front line (including 2 officers and 60 ORs of 15th Royal Scots) and reorganised them to face a German counter-attack. This came in at 08.00, and most of the 11th Suffolks still out in front were driven back to their start line (although some remained in the buildings until nightfall and returned with prisoners). Some 200 Germans penetrated into the British front line and had to be ejected by bombing parties from 10th Lincolns and 20th Northumberland Fusiliers from the flanks, and the fire of the brigade trench mortar battery. Overnight, 11th Suffolks were withdrawn to the support line so that the British heavy artillery could bombard the nearby enemy, and then reoccupied the front trench afterwards. The battalion then provided guides for the two Tyneside Scottish battalions tasked with renewing the attack in the morning. This also failed.

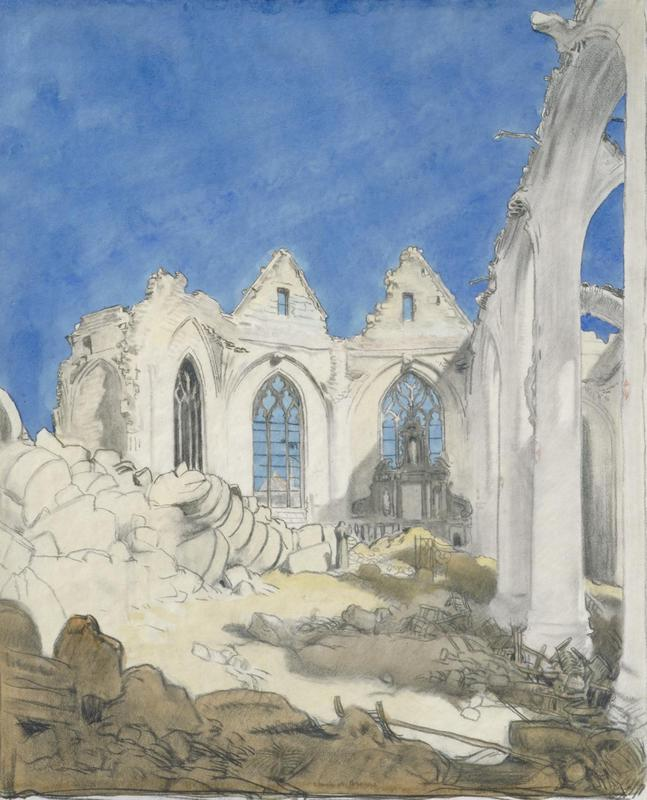
The Church, Péronne, by William Orpen, depicting the destruction carried out by German troops as they retreated to the Hindenburg Line in 1917.

=== Hargicourt ===
34th Division was relieved on 1 May and 11th Suffolks went by motor buses and marching to Pernois. Reinforcements were scarce: 11th Suffolks had suffered nearly 300 casualties in the fighting at Rœux, but only 114 reinforcements arrived on 3 May. Consequently, battalions of 34th Division were temporarily reduced from four to three companies. The division spent the whole of May resting and training the replacements. From 7 to 18 June 11th Suffolks took a spell in the line in the Gavrelle sector, relieving 102nd Bde in some newly captured trenches facing Greenland Hill. In line with the recent training, the battalion placed night outposts far out into No man's land. After that tour the division moved to the Péronne sector where after a spending a few days clearing the destruction in the liberated town the following weeks consisted of spells in the line interspersed with training for the next operation, which for 34th Division was to be at Hargicourt. This was a minor operation planned in great detail, one of a number of such attacks being carried out as diversions from that summer's main Ypres Offensive. The attack was carefully rehearsed behind the lines where turf had been cut to represent the enemy trenches. On 24 August 11th Suffolks moved into the front and support lines, with two companies in Priel Wood. The 'lines' here were not continuous trenches, but strings of outposts, and No man's land was unusually wide, patrolled by both sides at night.

During the night of 25/26 August a party from each attacking battalion laid a tape in No man's land, close to the enemy, and the troops formed up on this line in silence. The barrage came down at 04.30 on 26 August and all four battalions of 101st Bde closed up to it, 11th Suffolks on the left, with a company of 23rd Northumberland Fusiliers to bomb their way up 'Riflepit Trench' on their left and form a flank guard. After four minutes the barrage lifted 50 yards (46 m) forward and then began to creep towards the enemy front line, followed by the infantry. The objectives were 'Malakoff Farm' and the trench system on 'Cologne Ridge' in front of Hargicourt, the capture of which would reduce German observation over British positions. The Suffolks had some hand-to-hand fight at the junction of 'Malakoff' and 'Sugar' trenches (the first objective or 'Black Line') and were slowed by a machine gun until its crew were dealt with. Then they pushed on past the farm to the second objective ('Red Line') along 'Malakoff Support Trench'. In the centre, B Company were held up getting through the farm, but this had been anticipated and the other two companies bombed their way inwards along the support trench behind the defenders. D Company also took part of 'Triangle Trench' in front. The battalion had achieved all its objectives by 04.50, but then had to suffer hours of retaliatory shellfire while they and the Royal Engineers consolidated. While clearing the trenches Corporal Sidney Day had led his bombing section forwards until they came across a stretch of levelled trench. Day went on by himself, bombing leftwards until he gained touch with those coming from the other direction. Returning to his section, a German stick-grenade landed among them, but Day seized the grenade and threw it out of the trench before it exploded. He then completed the trench clearing and established a forward post, which he held for 66 hours under shell, grenade and rifle fire. Corporal Day was awarded the Victoria Cross for his actions. 11th Suffolks left the Péronne sector on 25 September, having suffered 230 casualties in the period since June.

=== Ypres ===
Many of the reinforcements received at the end of September (11th Suffolks received 266) had minimal training, and it was claimed that some of them had never fired their rifles. 34th Division was now transferred north to the Ypres Salient where the offensive continued. After arriving on the night of 8/9 October the battalions of 101st Bde spent three days repairing roads so that the advance could continue. This was done in daylight and bad weather, under constant shell and machine gun fire, and cost the 11th Suffolks over 50 casualties (including Maj Tuck, in temporary command, who was wounded), even though it did not take part in the attack on 12 October (the First Battle of Passchendaele). On the night of 18/19 October the battalion's camp at Stray Farm was bombarded with gas shells, over 20 men becoming casualties and the whole battalion affected to some extent. The troops were now existing in wrecked farms and captured pillboxes linked by duckboard tracks amidst a sea of flooded shellholes. 11th Suffolks were not involved in 34th Division's unsuccessful attack on 22 October, and the division was withdrawn soon afterwards.

34th Division spent three months in a quieter sector to the south, then went into reserve in February 1918 before returning to the Arras sector in March. In January Lt-Col Kendrick left the battalion to take command of the divisional machine gun battalion (34th MG Bn). Major Leith-Hay-Clark had already left to command 25th Northumberland Fusiliers, so Maj A.B. Wright took temporary command of the battalion. By the beginning of 1918 the BEF was suffering a manpower crisis. Brigades were reduced from four to three battalions each, and the remainder were broken up to provide reinforcements for the others. 9th (S) Battalion of the Suffolks, serving with 6th Division, was one of those disbanded, and 15 officers and 300 ORs joined 11th Suffolks on 5 February. On 16 February Lt-Col Morris Richardson of the 20th Hussars assumed command of the battalion, but he was promoted to command a brigade on 20 March and Maj Tuck, hurried back from hospital in England, was promoted to succeed him. That night the 11th Suffolks took over the frontline trenches just north of the Sensée river.

=== Henin Hill ===
The Germans were soon to launch their Spring offensive, and their plans in the Arras area were quite well known. 11th Suffolks were on the extreme left (north) of the division's line, adjacent to 3rd Division. The offensives began at 04.15 on 21 March with a massive bombardment that moved across to include 101st Bde's frontage, causing damage and some casualties. A creeping barrage against the brigade at 07.00 was a feint and was not followed by an infantry attack, because the weight of the attack was directed further south against the neighbouring 59th (2nd North Midland) Division at Bullecourt, where the Forward Zone defences were broken. 102nd Brigade swung back to cover this flank. It was not until 15.00 that an intense bombardment was opened on 11th Suffolks, ceasing at 15.30 when the enemy attacked in waves from the south towards the junction of 34th and 3rd Divisions. C Company firing at close range, and B Company and Battalion HQ further back, caused heavy casualties to these waves passing their front. Nevertheless, the enemy penetrated between the two divisions and it was not until 18.00 that 11th Suffolks and 3rd Division threw them out again. The Suffolks established a 'bombing block'; to prevent the enemy working their way along the trenches. The Suffolks in 'Shaft Trench' were strafed by two enemy aircraft, and succeeded in bringing one down with rifle and Lewis gun fire. With both flanks of 34th Division under threat, 11th Suffolks received a warning order at 18.45 to prepare to withdraw to the second system of defence on Henin Hill after dark. These orders were confirmed at 20.00 and the battalion moved back. Despite being attacked in the process the withdrawal was successfully covered by the rearguards that Lt-Col Tuck had posted. The battalion had been occupying old Hindenburg Line positions, and as it withdrew the Royal Engineers set fire to the timber of a tunnel, producing dense columns of smoke and 30 feet (9.1 m) flames from the tunnel entrances.

Between 09.00 and 10.00 next morning, the enemy attacked out of a thick mist and broke through 15th Royal Scots on the right of 101st Bde, then began attacking the rest of the brigade from the rear. 11th Suffolks, reinforced by about 100 men from 22nd Northumberland Fusiliers and with A Company of 34th MG Bn in support, held on to Henin Hill, even though its flank was exposed. The Germans brought field guns up to close range and attacked with aircraft: the troops were slowly pushed back through their trenches. Between 17.00 and 18.00 the hill was heavily bombarded, but it was not until after dark that 11th Suffolks and its supporters withdrew to avoid being encircled. Half went northwards along 'Hind Trench' to join 3rd Division, the remainder under Lt-Col Tuck north-westwards to the third system defences in front of Boyelles. During the withdrawal the latter party manned a bank and brought down. effective fire on enemy troops trying to advance westwards. The last to withdraw were the adjutant, Capt J.H. Brett, with a group of assorted details, who remained at 'Crucifix Corner' on the hill until 02.30 next morning, covering 3rd Division's withdrawal. 34th Division was relieved that night, and the battalion concentrated at Hamelincourt in the morning, before going back to bivouacs at Ayette.

=== Battle of the Lys ===
34th Division was moved north to a quieter area to recuperate, occupying a line in the Houplines sector, in front of Armentières. The battalions had to absorb inexperienced reinforcements and improve the neglected defences. Unfortunately, this was the sector chosen for the next phase of the German spring offensive (the Battle of the Lys). It began with heavy mustard gas shelling of Armentières on 7 April, the gas drifting across the rear areas of the defences. The bombardment began at 04.00 on 9 April, and included Erquinghem, where 11th Suffolks were bivouacked out of the front line. The battalion spread out in 'artillery formation' in the fields in front of the village. Once again, the main weight of the offensive was to the south of 34th Division, where 40th Division's positions were overrun. At first 11th Suffolks sent two companies as reserve to 103rd Bde holding the long line in front of Armentières, but as news came in from 40th Division the whole of 101st Brigade from divisional reserve was sent south to protect the flank. 11th Suffolks put three companies into the line on the right of 103rd Bde at 'Streaky Bacon Farm' and one in reserve, facing south towards Fleurbaix, supported by No 4 Section of A Company 34th MG Bn. The line was established at 15.00, though there was a gap to the two Royal Scots battalions further right. However, 12th Suffolks of 121st Bde, 40th Division, falling back after a long defence of Fleurbaix, filled this gap. Further German attempts to advance were repulsed. Next day (10 April) the rest of 101st Bde was heavily attacked and forced back to the River Lys. 11th Suffolks, operating under the command of 121st Bde, sent its reserve company in a counter-attack near Bois-Grenier at 08.45, which restored the line, but the battalion was gradually forced back 1 mile (1.6 km) to Erquinghem. The centre of the battalion was temporarily broken and the remnant of the MG section was overrun. Battalion HQ dug in just west of La Rolanderie Farm and acted as reserve, sending men forward as required. Orders to withdraw arrived at 15.30, but behind the battalion the Armentières salient was being evacuated, and an appeal was made to Lt-Col Tuck for 11th Suffolks to hold out for two hours longer to allow the troops to get away. Finally, at 17.00 reinforcements from 29th Division arrived, covering the battalion's withdrawal, though some men of 11th Suffolks were surrounded and taken prisoner. 101st Brigade crossed the river at Erquinghem and formed up on the far bank.

34th Division was still in a dangerous salient around Nieppe, and supplies failed to arrive that night. 11th Suffolks was not involved in the fighting next day, but when ordered to withdraw at dusk its planned line of retreat was already blocked by enemy troops and it had to cut across country to go into reserve at la Blanche Maison. During 12–14 April the retreat continued as the BEF struggled to maintain a continuous line. 101st Brigade had to form an east–west flank guard on 12 April, and 11th Suffolks were involved in fighting on 13 April. By now the battalion contained remnants of 18th Northumberland Fusiliers (the divisional pioneer battalion) and 15th West Yorkshire Regiment from 31st Division as well as its own men. On 14 April the battalion was engaged in digging a new defence line behind Bailleul, but at 21.00 it found itself in the front line when the 59th Division in front was broken through. The battalion continued digging and wiring the forward slopes of Mont Noir and Mont Rouge, and held off attacks on the afternoon of 16 April and again on 17 April. By now the whole of 101st Bde had been formed into a single composite battalion. It was finally moved into reserve on the night of 17/18 April, and the division was relieved by French troops on 21 April. During the Battles of the Lys the 11th Suffolks had lost 8 officers and 42 ORs killed or died of wounds, 10 officers and 157 ORs wounded, and 5 officers and 272 ORs missing, a number of whom survived as prisoners-of-war (POWs).

=== Reorganisation ===
From 21 April to mid-May 34 Division was engaged in digging new defence lines in the rear (though the men were twice called on to 'stand to' and prepare to defend these positions when German breakthroughs looked possible). After the disasters of the German offensive, the BEF did not have sufficient reinforcements to return all its formations to full strength. The decision was made to reduce some divisions to cadres to train US troops, with the hope that they could be rebuilt later. 34th Division was one of those selected, but three of its infantry battalions, including 11th Suffolks, were spared this fate and instead transferred to 61st (2nd South Midland) Division. The Suffolks joined 183rd Bde on 26 May. With the decision to maintain the battalion for frontline duty, it was sent a draft of 200 reinforcements.

=== Hundred Days Offensive ===
11th Suffolks joined 61st Division at Molinghem near the limit of the recent German advance, which became a quiet sector. It spent about 10 weeks in this sector, training for open warfare when out of the line. It spent the first week of August training, and then went into the line at 02.00 on 8 August. The Allied Hundred Days Offensive began that morning with the Battle of Amiens further south, but there had been reports that the Germans were withdrawing in front of 61st Division, and 11th Suffolks was ordered to go 'over the top' and get in touch with the enemy. The battalion moved out at 06.30 and an hour later had occupied Le Sart without resistance. However the enemy occupied some farms in front of Merville and the battalion could not go further without artillery support. It was shelled in the line that it took up that night. On 10 August 11th Suffolks went into divisional reserve, but on 19 August the Germans abandoned Merville and the advance was resumed next day. Once again 11th Suffolks acted as advance guard for 183rd Bde, though one company and part of another were hit by a barrage of high explosive and gas shells while moving up to their assembly positions and suffered many casualties. The advance at 15.30 met brisk fire from German rearguards and the troops had to negotiate mines and booby-traps, but by sunset the battalion had advanced the line by 2,500 yards (2,300 m) on the left and 1,000 yards (910 m) on the right. On 22 August the 11th Suffolks were placed in brigade reserve while the advance continued against increased resistance, and then went into divisional reserve. During August the battalion had suffered 334 casualties, 234 of them injured by gas; it received a draft of 309 men at the end of the month.

11th Suffolks returned to the front line on 7 September and were heavily shelled. C Company attempted to advance next day but was forced to withdraw by heavy machine gun fire. The following day A Company reached the outskirts of Erquinghem, where the battalion had been introduced to trench warfare in February, and which it had defended in April 1918. D Company was unsuccessful with an early dawn attempt to take the village, which was protected with thick wire, but the outposts had been advanced. On 11 September the battalion was withdrawn and spent the rest of the month training for open warfare. In early October the division moved to Halloy in GHQ Reserve and then by rail on 10 October to Cantaing where it resumed training.

=== Battle of the Selle ===
Finally on 24 October 61st Division was brought up to join the week-old Battle of the Selle. At 04.00 the division attacked towards the Écaillon stream. 11th Suffolks got over the stream quickly in spite of heavy fire and pressed on to the objective. Three of the company commanders became casualties, and one company lost all its officers and was led onto the objective by the Company Quartermaster Serjeant. At 06.15 there was a heavy counter-attack on the left rear of B Company: the rest of 183rd Bde had been held up attacking towards Vendegies-sur-Écaillon, and 11th Suffolks had to form a defensive flank. It was not until 19.00 that the battalion gained touch with the left, but the Germans evacuated Vendegies after dark. 11th Suffolks lost 33 dead in this last formal attack. On 27 October the battalion pushed a section across the Rhonelle river, but they were all killed or captured. On 29 October battalion HQ was hit by a shell that caused numerous casualties. The battalion supported 9th Northumberland Fusiliers in a successful attack over the Rhonelle on 1 November, but its role was limited to carrying supplies. 11th Suffolks went into billets next day and on 3 November it received a draft of 167 men to begin training for the next attack.

=== Post-Armistice ===
When the Armistice with Germany came into force on 11 November 1918, 11th Suffolks was still in rest billets at Bermerain, training for the next attack that never came. After 10 days in Cambrai it entrained for Abbeville, where it was billeted in Ailly-le-Haut-Clocher for the winter. Here demobilisation got under way in January 1919. Serious disturbances broke out in the base areas and the battalion was sent to secure the important railway depot at Audruicq. Here it was employed for general guard duties and supervising parties of German POWs working in the camps and yards. As demobilisation proceeded, the battalion was kept up to strength by drafts from the 1st Cambridgeshires, 12th Suffolks and other regiments. In February the 11th Suffolks, along with other service battalions, were presented with a King's Colour. The battalion under the command of Lt-Col Tuck was the representative British contingent at the French Peace Review at Rouen on 14 July 1919. 61st Division was disbanded on 30 July, and until the end of its service 11th Suffolks remained in the Arras area, where it took part in the first anniversary of Armistice Day. By now the battalion had been reduced to a cadre, which returned to Cambridge on 15 November to a reception by the Cambridge and Isle of Ely TF Association. Disbandment was completed on 9 December 1919.

During its service 242 officers and 5469 ORs passed through 11th Suffolks, of whom 43 officers and 915 ORs died (not counting those who died of wounds after evacuation to the UK). A further 100 officers and 2525 ORs were wounded, and 9 officers and 163 ORs were taken prisoner.

== Uniforms and insignia ==
During the early days of Kitchener's Army there were shortages of khaki cloth. However, the Cambridgeshire TA Association was able to have uniforms, service caps and greatcoats made from blue cloth, which were worn during training until khaki could be issued. The battalion wore the Suffolk Regiment cap badge but had a unique brass shoulder title with 'CAMBS' added over the curved 'SUFFOLK'. 101st Brigade adopted an identification system of coloured tapes worn on the shoulder straps beneath the brass titles: this was yellow in the case of the 11th Suffolks, who also wore a yellow bar painted on both sides of the brown-painted steel helmet. All the battalion's riding and transport horses wore a yellow leather brow band. The 34th Divisional sign was a black-and-white chequerboard painted on transport vehicles, but it was not worn on uniforms while 11th Suffolks served with the division. 183rd Brigade of 61st (2nd SM) Division used cloth triangles worn on both sleeves below the shoulder to identify its battalions; when 11th Suffolks joined it adopted these in Cambridge Blue.

== Commanders ==
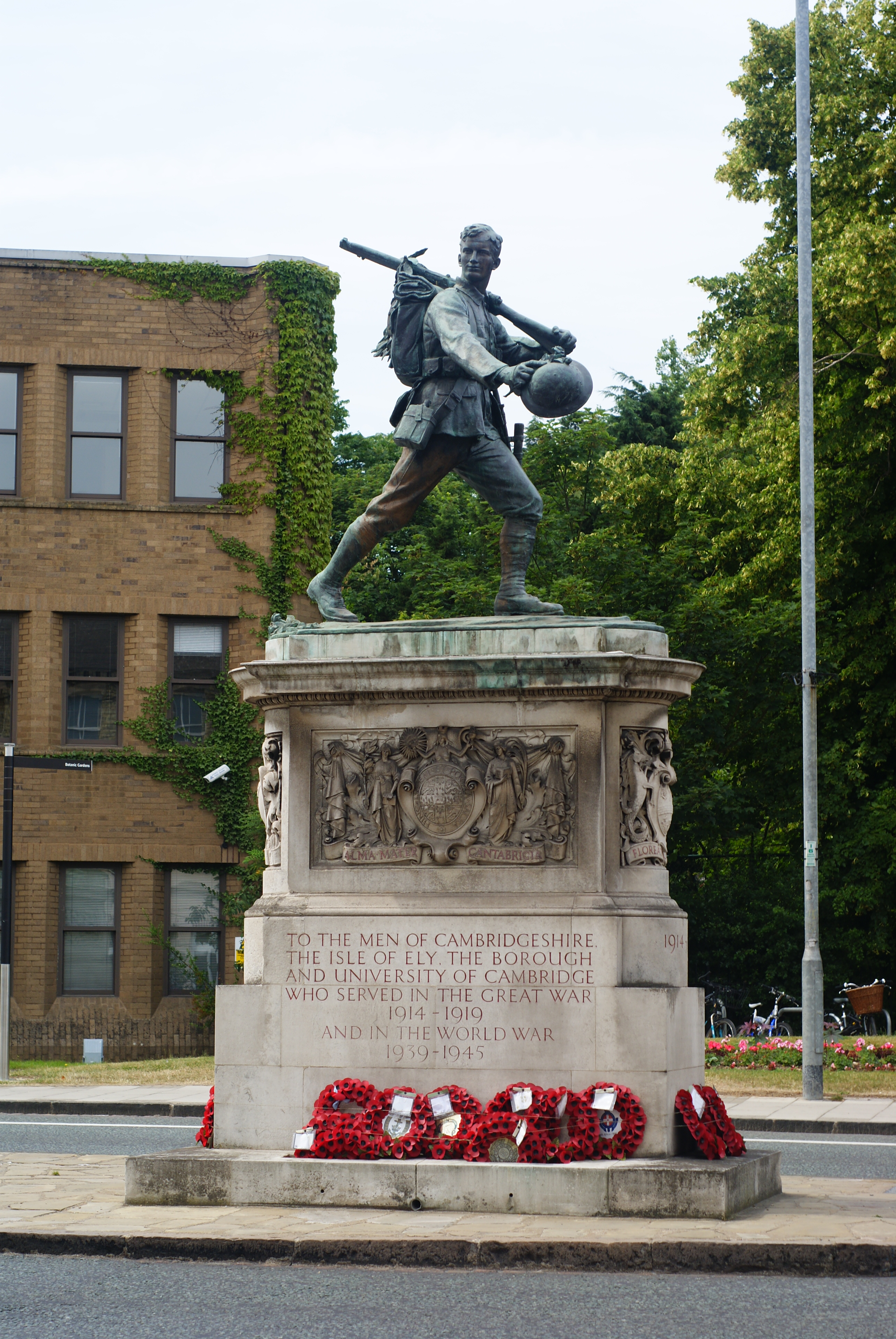
The Homecoming: war memorial to the men of Cambridge and the Isle of Ely.

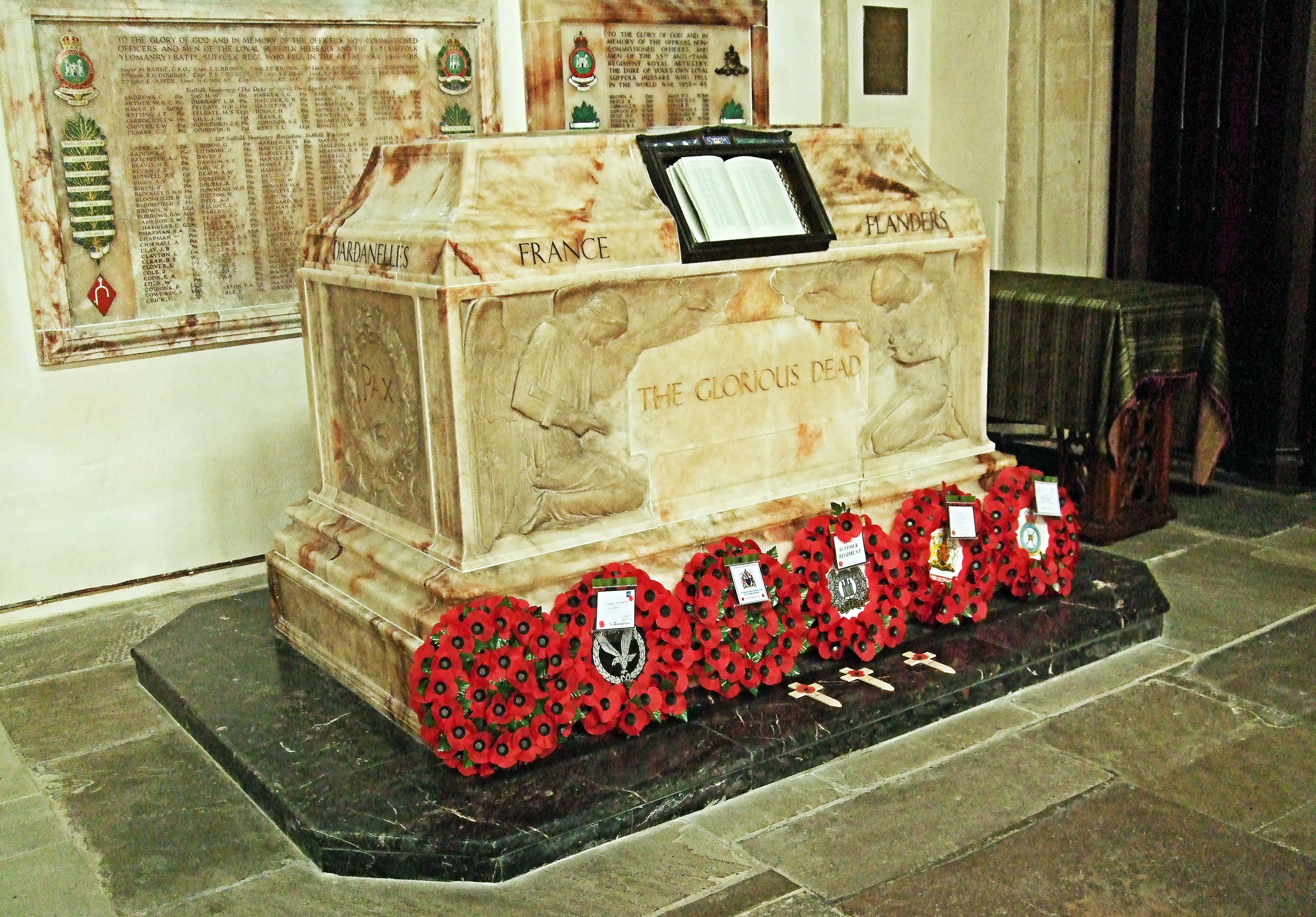
The Cenotaph to the dead of World War I in the Suffolk Regimental Chapel.

The following officers commanded the battalion during its service:

- Col C.T. Heycock (Cambridgeshire Regiment), acting until 30 September 1914
- Lt-Col C.W. Somerset, MVO, (Indian Army), 30 September 1914 to 3 September 1916
- Lt-Col E.H. Kendrick, DSO (Royal Dublin Fusiliers) 4 October 1916–January 1918 (transferred to CO 34th Bn Machine Gun Corps)
- Lt-Col M.E. Richardson, DSO (20th Hussars), 16 February–20 March 1918 (promoted to Brig-Gen)
- Lt-Col G.L.J. Tuck, DSO and Bar, promoted 20 March 1918, to disbandment

== Memorials ==
Many of the 11th Suffolks who died on 1 July 1916 are buried at Gordon Dump Cemetery, Ovillers-la-Boisselle, many others are commemorated on the Thiepval Memorial to the Missing of the Somme. There are memorials to 34th Division at La Boiselle and at Mont Noir (Zwarteberg) where it fought during the Battle of the Lys.

There is a memorial in Cambridge dedicated to the Men of Cambridge and the Isle of Ely. Known as 'The Homecoming' it features a bronze figure of a bareheaded soldier striding out. There is a war memorial chapel in Ely Cathedral with oak panels bearing the names of 5320 men of Cambridgeshire and the Isle of Ely who died in World War I. The King's Colour of the 11th Suffolks was laid up in the cathedral on 11 May 1922.

The Suffolk Regimental Chapel is in St Mary's Church, Bury St Edmunds, and includes a cenotaph built to honour the men who died in World War I.
