= Henry Wharton =

Henry Wharton may refer to:

- Henry Wharton (boxer) (born 1967), British boxer
- Henry Wharton (writer) (1664–1695), English writer and librarian
- Henry Wharton (soldier) (died 1689), English soldier
