= Sir Francis Lee, 4th Baronet =

English politician

Sir Francis Henry Lee, 4th Baronet (17 January 1639 – 4 December 1667) was an English politician who sat in the House of Commons from 1660 to 1667.

Lee was the son of Sir Francis Henry Lee, 2nd Baronet, of Quarrendon, Buckinghamshire, and his wife Hon. Anne St. John, daughter of Sir John St John, 1st Baronet of Lydiard Tregoze, later Countess of Rochester. In 1659 he succeeded his brother Henry in the baronetcy.

In 1660, Lee was elected Member of Parliament for Malmesbury in the Convention Parliament. He was re-elected MP for Malmesbury in 1661 for the Cavalier Parliament and sat until his death in 1667

Lee lived at Ditchley, Oxfordshire, and died at the age of 28.

== Marriage ==
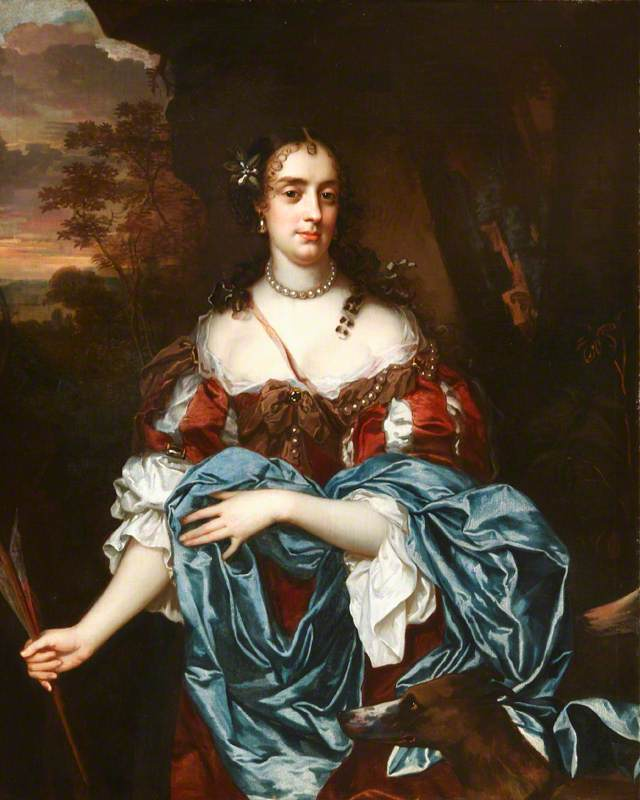
Lady Elizabeth Pope (1660–1719), Lady Lee, Later Countess of Lindsey, as Diana

Lee married Lady Elizabeth Pope, daughter of Thomas Pope, 2nd Earl of Downe (later third wife of Robert Bertie, 3rd Earl of Lindsey). His son Edward succeeded to the baronetcy and was later ennobled as Earl of Lichfield.

Baronetage of England
Preceded by Henry Lee	Baronet (of Quarendon); 1659–1667	Succeeded by Edward Lee
