= Arthur Frederick Saunders =

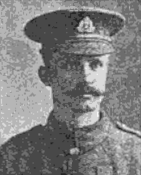
- Born: 22 April 1878; Ipswich, Suffolk, United Kingdom
- Died: 30 July 1947 (aged 69); Ipswich, Suffolk, United Kingdom
- Burial place: Ipswich Borough Crematorium
- Military career
- Allegiance: United Kingdom
- Branch: British Army; British Army
- Service years: 1895–1910 (Navy); 1914–16, 1940–44 (Army)
- Rank: Petty officer (Navy); Sergeant (Army)
- Service number: 3/10133
- Units: Royal Navy; Suffolk Regiment; Home Guard
- Conflicts: First World War: Battle of Loos
- Awards: Victoria Cross

Sergeant Arthur Frederick Saunders VC (22 April 1878 – 30 July 1947) was an English recipient of the Victoria Cross, the highest and most prestigious award for gallantry in the face of the enemy that can be awarded to British and Commonwealth forces.

Arthur went to sea as a Boy seaman, later serving in the Royal Navy until his 30th birthday, having been promoted to a senior rating. He returned to his home town, and worked for a local manufacturer. After the outbreak of war, he enlisted in the local infantry regiment. He saw active service in France with this unit for several weeks, until medically evacuated to Britain.

He was badly wounded in the engagement near Loos, for which he was later awarded the Victoria Cross, and was medically discharged the following year. He returned to his former employer. Whilst continuing to work for them during WW2, he also served as a senior NCO in the Home Guard. He died in 1947 aged 69.

== Early life ==
He was born on 22 April 1878 in Ipswich one of 12 children of Thomas Saunders, a saddle and harness maker, and his wife Anne Victoria Clarke. The family then lived at 180 Cauldwell Hall Road in the parish of St John's Church in Ipswich. He attended St John's Church of England Primary School in the town then California School in Ipswich.

== Navy ==
In November 1893 Arthur joined The Marine Society Training Ship Warspite, which was moored at Woolwich, and began training for the Merchant Navy.

On 25 February 1895 he joined the Royal Navy as a Boy, 2nd Class. On 22 April 1896 (his 18th birthday), he signed-up for a 12 year continuous service engagement with the Royal Navy, which he completed in 1908. He appears on shore on the 1901 census, at HMS Pembroke, the shore establishment (Stone frigate) of Chatham naval base. During his time in the Royal Navy he advanced to the rating of petty officer (2nd Class). After leaving the Royal Navy he worked for the agricultural equipment manufacturing company Ransomes, Sims & Jeffries.

== Army ==
Given that he was too old to enlist as a "Kitchener recruit", (Note: Recruits to the New Armies had to be between 19 and 30 years, as stated in Army Order 296 of 7 August 1914. The upper limit was raised to 35 by Army Order 341 of 31 August 1914. That same Army Order raised the upper limit to 45 for men enlisting in the Special Reserve) as he was over 35 years old, he enlisted under Special Reserve terms. On 19 September 1914 he enlisted in the British Army, under Special Reserve terms of service in the Suffolk Regiment, and was allocated a service number of 3/10133. His prior experience in the Royal Navy saw him promoted to Sergeant a month after enlistment, which equated to his former rank in the navy, and posted to the NCO cadre of the newly formed 9th Battalion. He served with the 9th (Service) Battalion of the Suffolk Regiment, deploying with them to France on 30 August 1915. His entry on the medal roll documents that his overseas service was exclusively with the 9th Battalion.

His award came as a result of the Battle of Loos on the Western Front in September 1915. His battalion were supporting the advance of the Cameron Highlanders. The following deed took place for which he was awarded the VC.

On 26 September 1915 near Loos, France,

When his officer had been wounded during the attack, Sergeant Saunders took charge of two machine-guns and a few men and, although severely wounded in the thigh, closely followed the last four charges of another battalion, giving them all possible support. Later, when the remains of the battalion which he had been supporting was forced to retire, he stuck to one of his guns and in spite of his wound, continued to give clear orders and by continuous firing did his best to cover the retirement.

A statement from Lt Philip Christison, an officer he assisted said:

a shell landed and blew part of his left leg off about the knee. I crawled over and got him into the shell-hole, putting a tourniquet on his leg and giving him my water bottle, as his was empty. I crawled back to my hole and a few minutes later on looking over the top I saw a fresh wave of Germans advancing. I was wondering what to do – whether to lie doggo or open fire. There seemed no point in opening fire as there were perhaps a hundred and fifty enemy advancing rather diagonally across our front. To my amazement I heard short sharp bursts of Lewis Gunfire coming from the shell-hole on my right. This was Sergeant Saunders more or less minus a leg! The Germans were taken by surprise and bunched up, so I joined in and between us we took a heavy toll and the rest retired out of sight.

They were recovered by stretcher bearers from the Royal Engineers, but further shelling left them abandoned before eventually being brought to an Advanced Dressing Station by stretcher bearers from the Scots Guards. (Note: 'Stretcher bearers from the RE got me and Sergeant Saunders on to stretchers but shells dropped close and we were abandoned. We were lucky, a stretcher bearer party from the Scots Guards picked us up and got us to an Advanced Dressing Station.') The regimental museum notes there is a widespread misapprehension that the wounds to his leg meant that it was amputated upon his arrival at an Advanced Dressing Station, however, this is inaccurate. The eyewitness account from Christison is to blame, and is misleading. (Note: 'Sergeant Saunders, now without a leg,[sic] was awarded the VC, while I was given the MC.')

On account of his wounds he was returned to England. His name appeared in the official casualty list that was republished in the newspapers on 20 October 1915, with the 27 other wounded men of the battalion. For the purposes of pay, upon arriving in Britain, he was taken off the strength of the battalion, and taken on the strength of the regimental depot whilst recuperating, but this did not mean he was physically present at Bury St Edmunds. He was initially treated at Beaulieu Hospital, Harrogate, Yorkshire. He was subsequently admitted to St Thomas’s Hospital, London and St George’s Hospital, Harrogate for long periods of ongoing treatment. After receiving medical care and going through a period of convalescence, his leg ended up three inches shorter; for this reason, he wore an orthopedic boot to assist him when walking. For the rest of his life, he was impacted by this injury.

The award of his Victoria Cross was announced on 30 March 1916, whilst still convalescing in hospital. His was the first of the two VCs to be awarded to the Suffolk Regiment. Lt Crispinson was awarded the Military Cross for his own part.

He received a hero's welcome in his town home of Ipswich on 22 June 1916. He met the town's mayor at the town hall with senior officers from his regiment. A collection held in his honour enabled him to purchase a house on Foxhall Road in the California district of east Ipswich. He was presented with his Victoria Cross on 27 June 1916 by King George V at Buckingham Palace.

He was given an honourable medical discharge from the army on 13 November 1916, having latterly been on the strength of the depot of the Suffolk Regiment. He was issued the Silver War Badge on 5 December 1916.

== Later life ==
In 1920 he was given Freedom of the Burgh of Ipswich, and in 1923 was made a Justice of the Peace.

In 1939, Saunders worked as a drawing office clerk in Ransomes, Sims & Jeffries lawn mower department. He continued to reside at 354 Foxhall Road. During the Second World War he served as a Company Sergeant Major in the 11th Battalion (Ipswich) Home Guard.

Early in 1947 he was invited to a dinner in his honour in Glasgow by the Cameron Highlanders whose retreat he had protected back in 1915 at Loos. He was granted honorary membership of the regiment.

He died on 30 July 1947 of kidney problems. He was cremated and his ashes scattered in Ipswich Cemetery's Garden of Rest.

== Legacy ==
His VC was given to the Suffolk Regiment Museum in Bury St Edmunds by his widow in 1989.

A blue plaque was erected to Arthur at his 1914 home of 180 Cauldwell Hall Road in Ipswich in September 2010. A memorial also exists in the paving at Christchurch Park in Ipswich.

== Family ==
On 6 December 1908 he married 18 year old Edith Muriel Everitt. Their son Thomas was born in 1909 Edward was born in 1912. His daughter Nina was born in 1923.
