= Suffolk Regiment =

Former regiment of the British Army

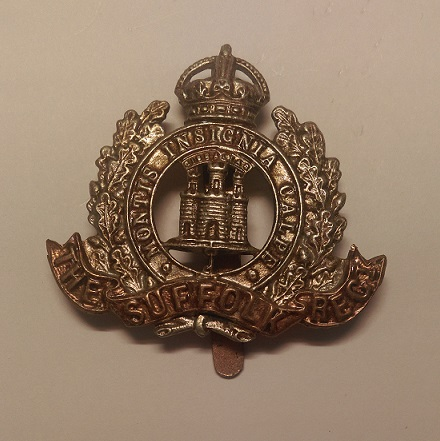
- Badge of the Suffolk Regiment
- Active: 20 June 1685–29 August 1959
- Country: Kingdom of England (1685–1707); Kingdom of Great Britain (1707–1800); United Kingdom (1801–1959)
- Branch: British Army
- Type: Infantry
- Role: Line infantry
- Size: 1–2 Regular battalions 1–2 Militia and Special Reserve battalions 1–4 Territorial and Volunteer battalions Up to 16 Hostilities-only battalions
- Garrison/HQ: Gibraltar Barracks, Bury St Edmunds
- Nickname: The Old Dozen
- Anniversaries: Minden Day
- Engagements: Battle of Minden; Great Siege of Gibraltar; Napoleonic Wars; Eureka Rebellion; Second Boer War; World War I World War II; Battle of Singapore

The Suffolk Regiment was an infantry regiment of the line in the British Army with a history dating back to 1685. It saw service for three centuries, participating in many wars and conflicts, including the First and Second World Wars, before being amalgamated with the Royal Norfolk Regiment to form the 1st East Anglian Regiment (Royal Norfolk and Suffolk) in 1959 which, in 1964, was further amalgamated with the 2nd East Anglian Regiment (Duchess of Gloucester's Own Royal Lincolnshire and Northamptonshire), the 3rd East Anglian Regiment (16th/44th Foot) and the Royal Leicestershire Regiment to create the present Royal Anglian Regiment.

== History ==
=== Early history ===
A regimental private in c. 1742

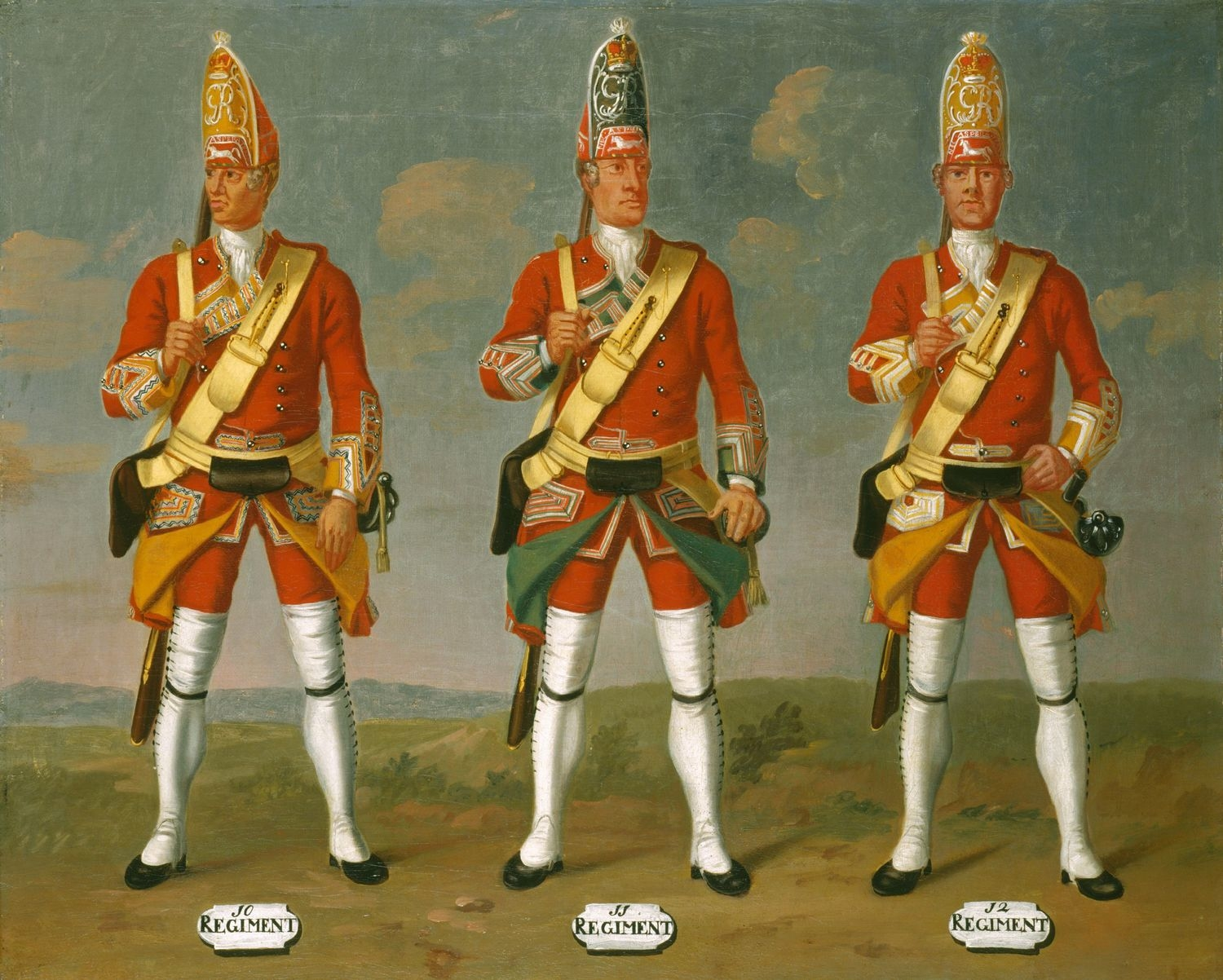
c. 1751 painting of a regimental grenadier (right)

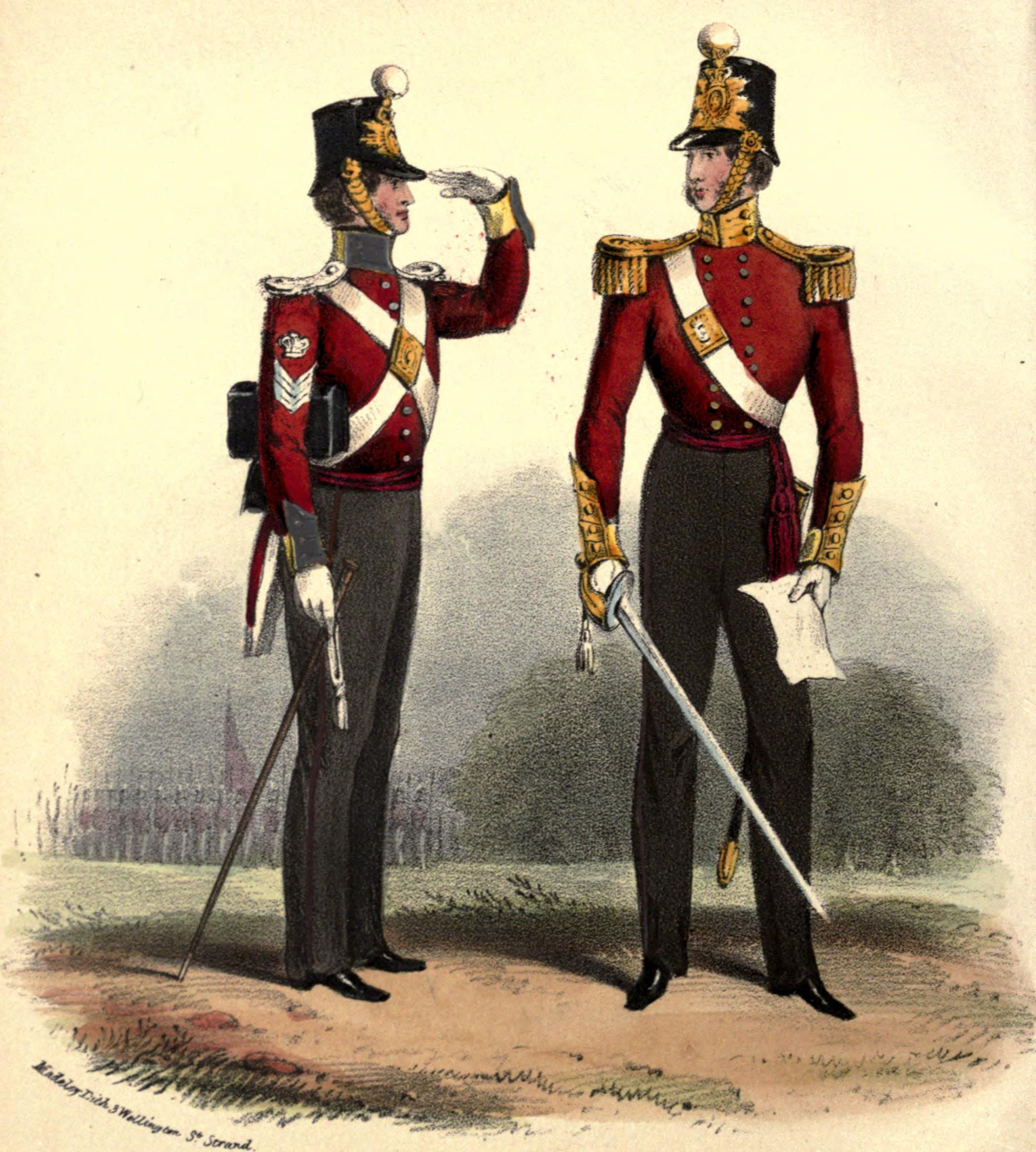
Regimental uniform, 1840s

In 1685, the Duke of Norfolk's Regiment of Foot was recruited in Norfolk and Suffolk by the Duke of Norfolk. Raised to suppress the Monmouth Rebellion, it became part of the Royal Army and its Colonel Lord Lichfield remained loyal to James II after the 1688 Glorious Revolution. He was replaced by Henry Wharton and the regiment fought throughout the 1689 to 1691 Williamite War in Ireland, including the Battle of the Boyne, the Capture of Waterford and the Siege of Limerick in 1690.

After the October 1691 Treaty of Limerick, it returned to England before being transferred to Flanders. When the Nine Years' War ended with the 1697 Treaty of Ryswick, the regiment was saved from disbandment by becoming part of the Irish establishment, then spent the War of the Spanish Succession in Jamaica. Returning to Flanders in 1742 during the War of the Austrian Succession, it fought at Dettingen in June 1743 and Fontenoy in May 1745, where it suffered 322 casualties, the largest of any British unit involved.

As a result of the 1751 army reforms, it was renamed the 12th Regiment of Foot and in 1758, the second battalion was detached to form the 65th (2nd Yorkshire, North Riding) Regiment of Foot. During the 1756 to 1763 Seven Years' War, it fought at the battles of Minden, Villinghausen and Wilhelmsthal, as well as the Siege of Cassel. In 1782, it was given a county association as the 12th (East Suffolk) Regiment of Foot.

=== Napoleonic Wars ===
The regiment embarked for the West Indies in 1793 and took part in the capture of Martinique, Saint Lucia and Guadeloupe in 1794. It returned to England in 1795 and then embarked for India in 1796 where it took part in operations against Tipu Sultan including the Siege of Seringapatam in April 1799 during the Fourth Anglo-Mysore War. It also took part in the Invasion of Île Bonaparte in July 1810 and the Invasion of Isle de France in November 1810 during the Napoleonic Wars.

=== The Victorian era ===
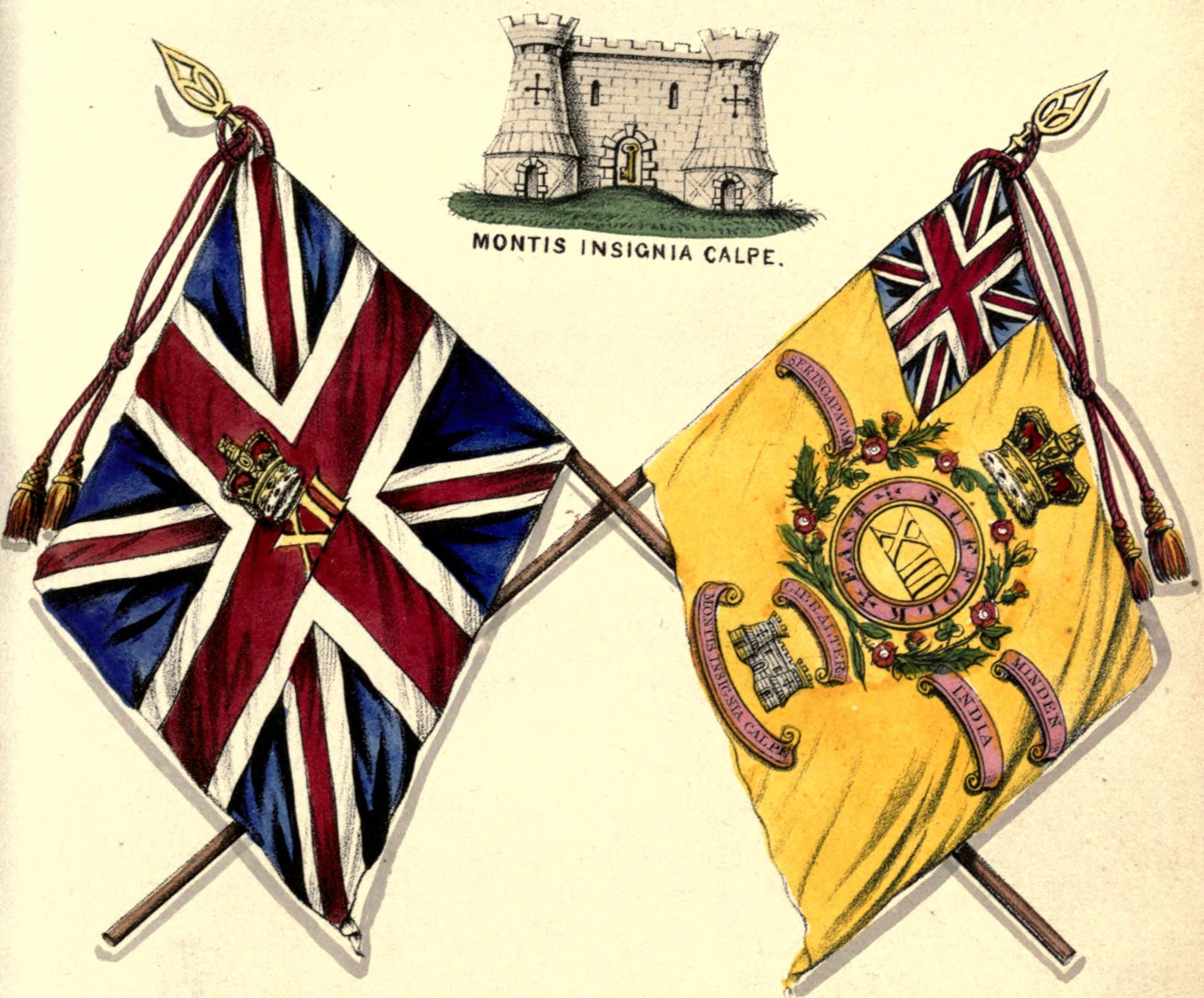
Regimental colours, 1848

While garrisoning the Australian Colony of Victoria in 1854, detachments from the regiment, the 40th Regiment of Foot and colonial police, suppressed the Eureka Rebellion, by gold prospectors at Ballarat. There was a skirmish involving the 12th regiment and a mob of rebellious miners. Foot police reinforcements had already reached the Ballarat government outpost on 19 October 1854. A further detachment of the 40th (2nd Somersetshire) Regiment of Foot arrived a few days behind. On 28 November, the 12th Regiment arrived to reinforce the local government camp. As they moved near where the rebels ultimately made their last stand, there was a clash, where a drummer boy, John Egan and several other members of the convoy were attacked by a mob looking to loot the wagons.

Tradition variously had it that Egan either was killed there and then or was the first casualty of the fighting on the day of the battle. However, his grave in Old Ballarat Cemetery was removed in 2001 after research carried out by Dorothy Wickham showed that Egan had survived and died in Sydney in 1860.

While still in Australia, elements of the 1st Battalion served in the New Zealand Wars between 1860 and 1867.

The regiment was not fundamentally affected by the Cardwell Reforms of the 1870s, which gave it a depot at Gibraltar Barracks in Bury St Edmunds from 1873, or by the Childers reforms of 1881 – as it already possessed two battalions, there was no need for it to amalgamate with another regiment and it became simply the Suffolk Regiment. The depot was the 32nd Brigade Depot from 1873 to 1881, and the 12th Regimental District depot thereafter. Under the reforms the regiment became the Suffolk Regiment on 1 July 1881. As the county regiment of Suffolk, it also gained the county's militia and rifle volunteer battalions, which were integrated into the regiment as numbered battalions. After these reforms, the regiment now included:

Regulars

- 1st Battalion
- 2nd Battalion

Militia

- 3rd (Militia) Battalion based in Bury St Edmunds, former West Suffolk Militia
- 4th (Militia) Battalion based in Ely, former Cambridgeshire Militia

Volunteer Force

- 1st Suffolk Rifle Volunteers based in Woodbridge, renamed 1st Volunteer Battalion in 1888
- 6th (West Suffolk) Suffolk Rifle Volunteers based in Sudbury, renamed 2nd Vol Btn in 1881
- 1st (Cambridge, Essex and Huntingdonshire) Cambridgeshire Rifle Volunteers based in Cambridge, renamed 3rd (Cambridgeshire) Vol Btn in 1881
- 3rd (Cambridge University) Cambridgeshire Rifle Volunteer Corps based in Cambridge, renamed 4th (Cambridge University) Vol Btn in 1881

The 1st Battalion served in the Second Boer War: it assaulted a hill near Colesberg in January 1900 and suffered many casualties including the commanding officer.

By contrast between 1895 and 1914, the 2nd Battalion, Suffolk Regiment was not involved in hostilities. It was stationed for the majority of the time in India. Garrison postings during this period include; Secunderabad (India) 1895, Rangoon and the Andaman Islands (Burma) 1896 to 1899, Quetta (North West Frontier) 1899 to 1902, Karachi and Hyderabad (Northern India, now Pakistan) 1902 to 1905, Madras (India) 1905 to 1907, Aden 1907, returning to England in 1908.

During its service in India the 2nd Battalion became known as a "well officered battalion that compared favourably with the best battalion in the service having the nicest possible feeling amongst all ranks". The 2nd was also regarded as a good shooting battalion with high level of musketry skills. The spirit of independence and self-reliance exhibited by officers and non-commissioned officers led to the 2nd Battalion taking first place in the Quetta Division of the British Army of India, from a military effectiveness point of view, in a six-day test. This test saw the men under arms for over 12 hours a day conducting a wide selection of military manoeuvres, including bridge building, retreats under fire, forced marches and defending ground and fixed fortifications.

In 1908, the Militia and Volunteers were reorganised nationally, with the former becoming the Special Reserve (SR) and the latter the Territorial Force (TF). The regiment now had the 3rd (Reserve) of the SR at Gibraltar Barracks and the 4th (at Portman Road in Ipswich) and 5th (at Gibraltar Barracks) TF battalions. In 1910 the regiment gained another Territorial unit, the 6th (Cyclist) Battalion (at Woodbridge Road in Ipswich), after the breakup of the Essex and Suffolk Cyclist Battalion.

=== First World War ===
==== Regular Army ====
The 1st Battalion landed at Le Havre as part of the 84th Brigade in the 28th Division in January 1915 for service on the Western Front and then transferred to Egypt on 24 October 1915. It suffered some 400 casualties at the Second Battle of Ypres in May 1915.

The 2nd Battalion landed at landed at Le Havre as part of the 14th Brigade in 5th Division in August 1914. The value of the 2nd Battalion's 20 years of peacetime training was exemplified at the Battle of Le Cateau on 26 August 1914, a mere 23 days since Britain had declared war on Germany. In this action the 2nd Battalion undertook a fierce rear-guard defence out-manned and out-gunned by superior numbers of enemy. The 2nd Battalion held their defensive position despite losing their commanding officer, Lt. Col. C.A.H. Brett DSO, at the commencement of the action and their second in command, Maj. E.C. Doughty, who was severely wounded after six hours of battle as he went forward to take ammunition to the hard-pressed battalion machine gunners.

Almost totally decimated as a fighting unit after over eight hours of incessant fighting, the 2nd Battalion, Suffolk Regiment was gradually outflanked but would still not surrender. This was despite the fact that the German Army, knowing the 2nd Battalion had no hope of survival, entreated them to surrender, even ordering the German buglers to sound the British Cease Fire and gesticulating for the men of the 2nd to lay down their arms. At length an overwhelming force rushed the 2nd Battalion from the rear, bringing down all resistance and the 2nd's defence of Le Cateau was at an end. Those remaining alive were taken captive by the Germans, spending the next four years as prisoners of war and not returning home until Christmas Day 1918.

As an example of their valour and the level of training they had been subject to as a peacetime unit, it is noted that 720 men of 2nd Battalion, Suffolk Regiment total roll call of some 1,000, many of whom had been with the battalion since the 1899 posting to Quetta, were killed, wounded or captured. This fight-to-the-last-man defence at Le Cateau was later recognised as a key factor in preventing the German occupation of Paris. The battalion, due to the casualties sustained, was transferred to GHQ Troops before, on 25 October, transferring to the 8th Brigade of the 3rd Division and, almost a year later, transferred to 76th Brigade of the same division, where they were to remain for the rest of the year.

==== Special Reserve ====
The 3rd (Reserve) Battalion went to its war station in the Harwich Garrison, where it spent the war carrying out is twin roles of home defence and preparing reinforcement drafts for the Regular battalions serving overseas. It also spun off the 10th (Reserve) Battalion, which carried out the same task for the 7th, 8th and 9th (Service) Battalions until it became 26th Training Reserve Battalion in 1916.

==== Territorial Force ====
The 1/4th Battalion landed at Le Havre and joined the Jullundur Brigade of the 3rd (Lahore) Division in November 1914 for service on the Western Front. It ended the war as the pioneer battalion of the 58th (2/1st London) Division. The 1/5th Battalion landed at Suvla Bay as part of the 163rd (1/1st Norfolk and Suffolk) Brigade in the 54th (East Anglian) Division in August 1915; it was evacuated from Gallipoli in December 1915 and moved to Egypt and saw action again at First Battle of Gaza in March 1917 and through the Sinai and Palestine campaign. The 1/6th (Cyclist) Battalion served in home defence throughout the war.

Soon after the outbreak of war the TF formed 2nd Line battalions, initially to supply reinforcements to the 1st Line serving overseas, then as service battalions in their own right. The 2/4th, 2/5th and 2/6th (Cyclist) Battalions served in home defence throughout the war. The 3rd Line battalions were formed in 1915 to supply reinforcements. The 3/6th (Cyclist) Battalion was disbanded in 1916, the 3/4th and 3/5th amalgamated as 4th Reserve Battalion, and then absorbed the reserve battalion of the Cambridgeshire Regiment to form the Cambridge and Suffolk (Reserve) Battalion.

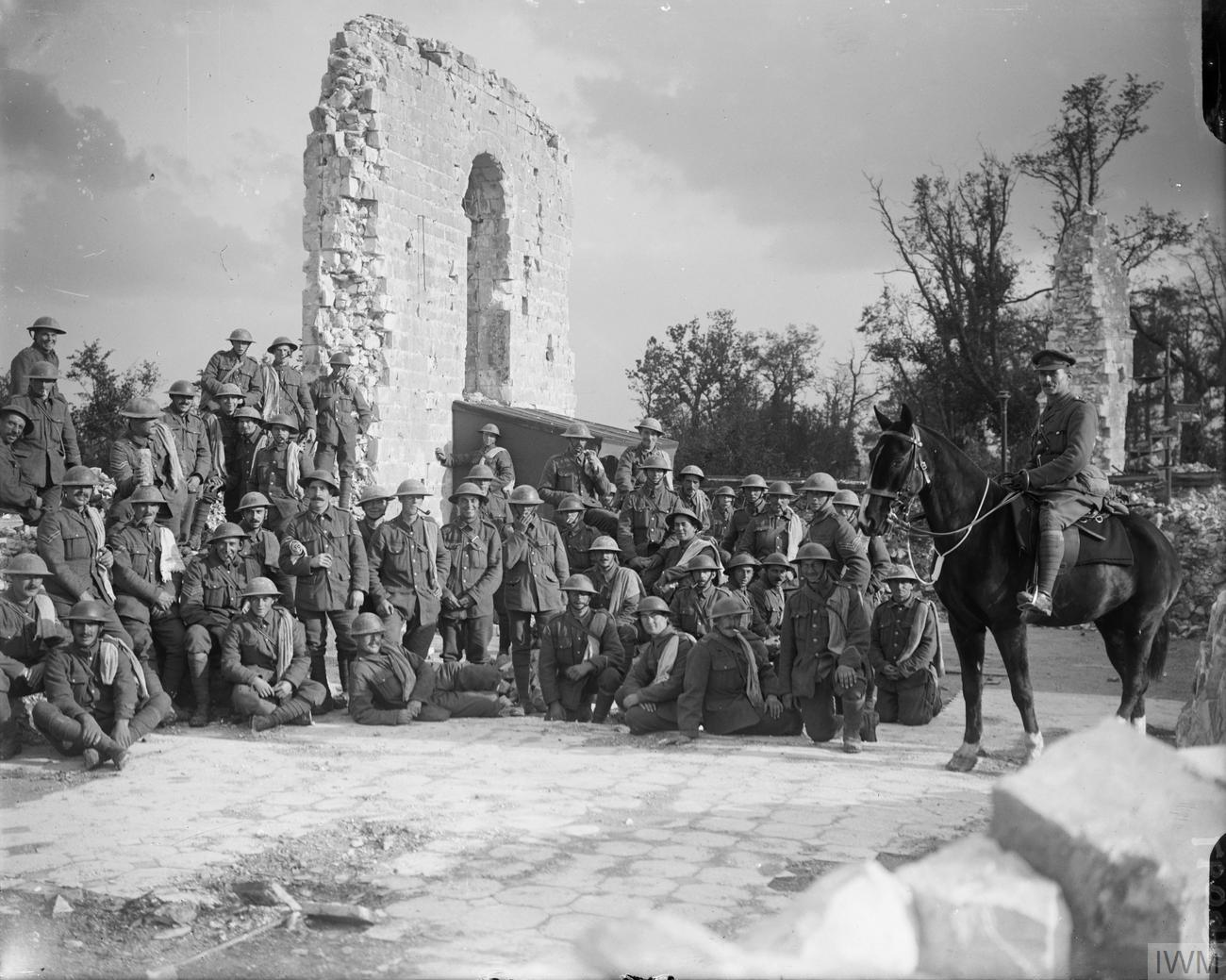
Men of the 7th (Service) Battalion, Suffolk Regiment, in the ruins of the church in Tilloy, France, 18 October 1917

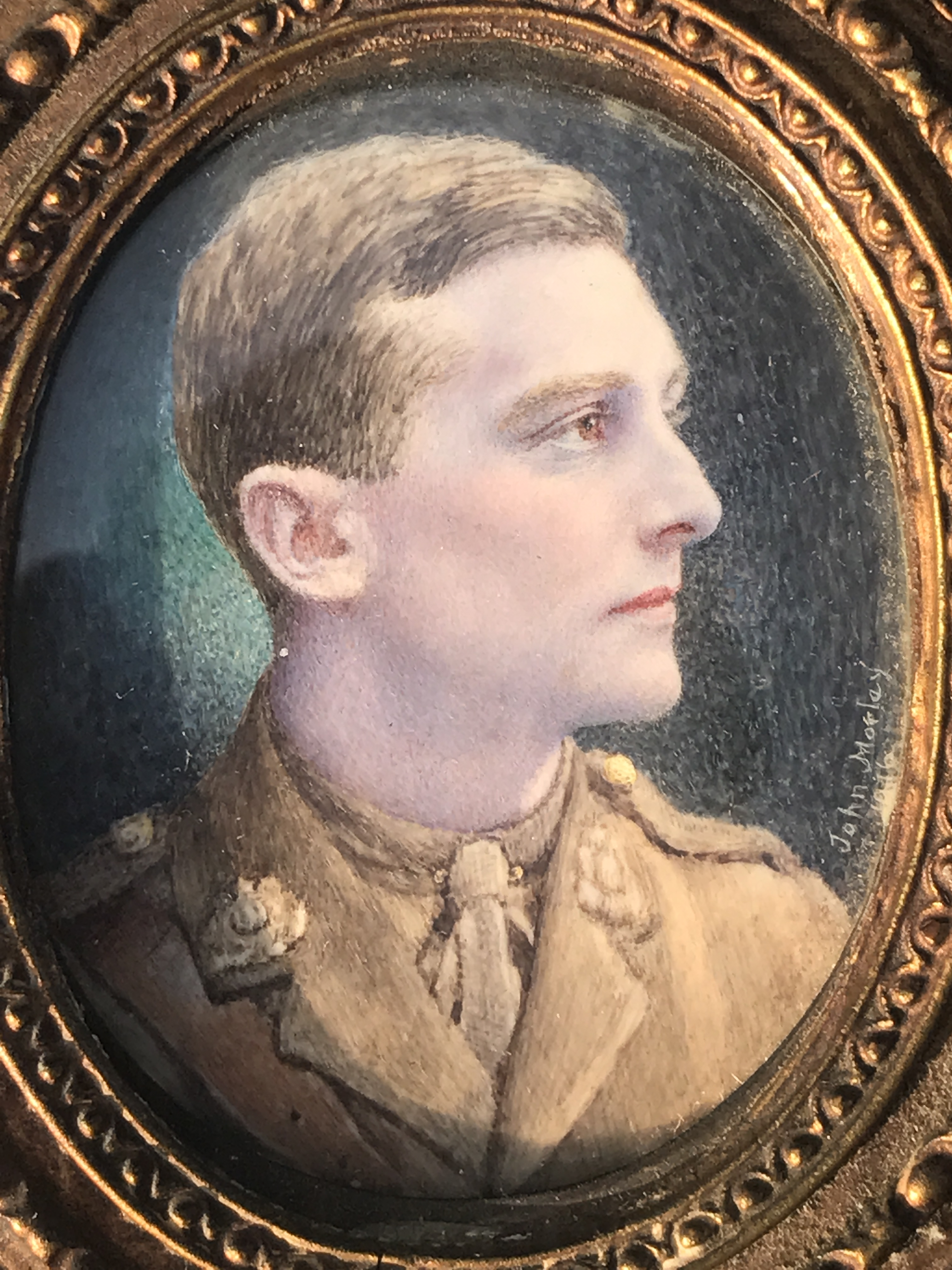
Miniature portrait of the 7th Battalion's Captain Vesey Davoren (1888–1989), in uniform, presented to him on 15 January 1916 by the artist John Morley

Members of the TF who had not volunteered for overseas service were formed into Provisional Battalions, 4th and 5th Suffolks forming 64th Provisional Battalion. The Military Service Act 1916 swept away the home/foreign service distinction, and all TF soldiers became liable for overseas service, if medically fit. On 1 January 1917 the provisional units became numbered battalions of their parent regiments, with 64th Provisional Bn, becoming 14th Suffolks, serving in bhome defence.

15th (Suffolk Yeomanry) Battalion was formed in Egypt in 1917 from the dismounted Suffolk Yeomanry. It served as infantry in Palestine until the end of the war.

==== New Army ====
A number of battalions were raised in 1914–15 as part of the New Armies ('Kitchener's Army'). The 7th, 8th and 9th (Service) Battalions were formed at Bury St Edmunds and all served on the Western Front. The 7th (S) Battalion landed at Boulogne-sur-Mer as part of the 35th Brigade in 12th (Eastern) Division in May 1915. (Note: War Diary - 7th Battalion Suffolk Regiment, 13 October 1915, reporting on action (machine-gun carnage) on the Hohenzollern Redoubt on October 11th: Officers Killed: Major Currey (Vere Fortrey), ("an unsurpassed linguist", killed commanding ‘B’ Company in the first attack upon the south side of the “Hair-pin”); Captain Cobbold (Charles Augustus), a pre-war director of the brewing magnates Ind, Coope and Co.; Captain Sorley (Charles Hamilton); Lt Gedge (Peter); Lt Wood (Geoffrey Dayrell), (played one 1st class cricket match, Oxford v MCC); 2/Lt Hartopp (Charles William Liddell); 2/Lt Lee (Richard); severely wounded: 2/Lt Smith (Donald Claude) died that day. Officers Wounded: Major Henty (George Herbert), (died 30 Nov. 1917), Lt Davoren (Vesey Alred) (only survivor).) The 8th (Service) Battalion landed in France as part of the 53rd Brigade in 18th (Eastern) Division in July 1915 and served until it was disbanded in February 1918. The 9th (Service) Battalion landed at Boulogne as part of 71st Brigade in 24th Division in August 1915. It was also disbanded in February 1918. Sergeant Arthur Frederick Saunders of the 9th Battalion was awarded the Victoria Cross while serving with the battalion during the Battle of Loos, the largest British Army offensive of 1915.

The Cambridge Service Battalion was a Kitchener's Army unit formed by the Cambridge TF Association and later assigned to the Suffolk Regiment as the 11th (Service) Battalion (Cambridgeshire). It landed at Boulogne as part of the 101st Brigade in 34th Division in January 1916 also for action on the Western Front. Corporal Sidney James Day won the VC for his actions at Hargicourt on 26 August 1917. The battalion ended the war as part of 61st (2nd South Midland) Division.

The 12th (Service) Battalion (East Anglia) was a Bantam battalion formed at Bury St Edmunds in 1915. It landed at Le Havre as part of the 121st Brigade in 40th Division in June 1916. In 1918 it was reduced to a cadre and returned to England to be reformed by absorbing the newly-formed 16th Battalion. It went back to the Western Front and ended the war as part of 43rd Brigade in 14th (Light) Division.

13th (Reserve) Battalion, Suffolk Regiment (Cambridgeshire) was formed in 1915 from the reserve companies of the 11th Battalion; in 1916 it became 108th Training Reserve Battalion.

1st (Reserve) Garrison and 2nd (Home Service) Garrison Battalions were also formed in 1916 and served in England.

=== Interwar period ===
The 1st battalion saw action in the campaign against the Moplahs in Malabar in 1922 while the 2nd battalion was deployed to Shanghai in 1927 before moving to India in 1929.

=== Second World War ===
==== Regular Army ====
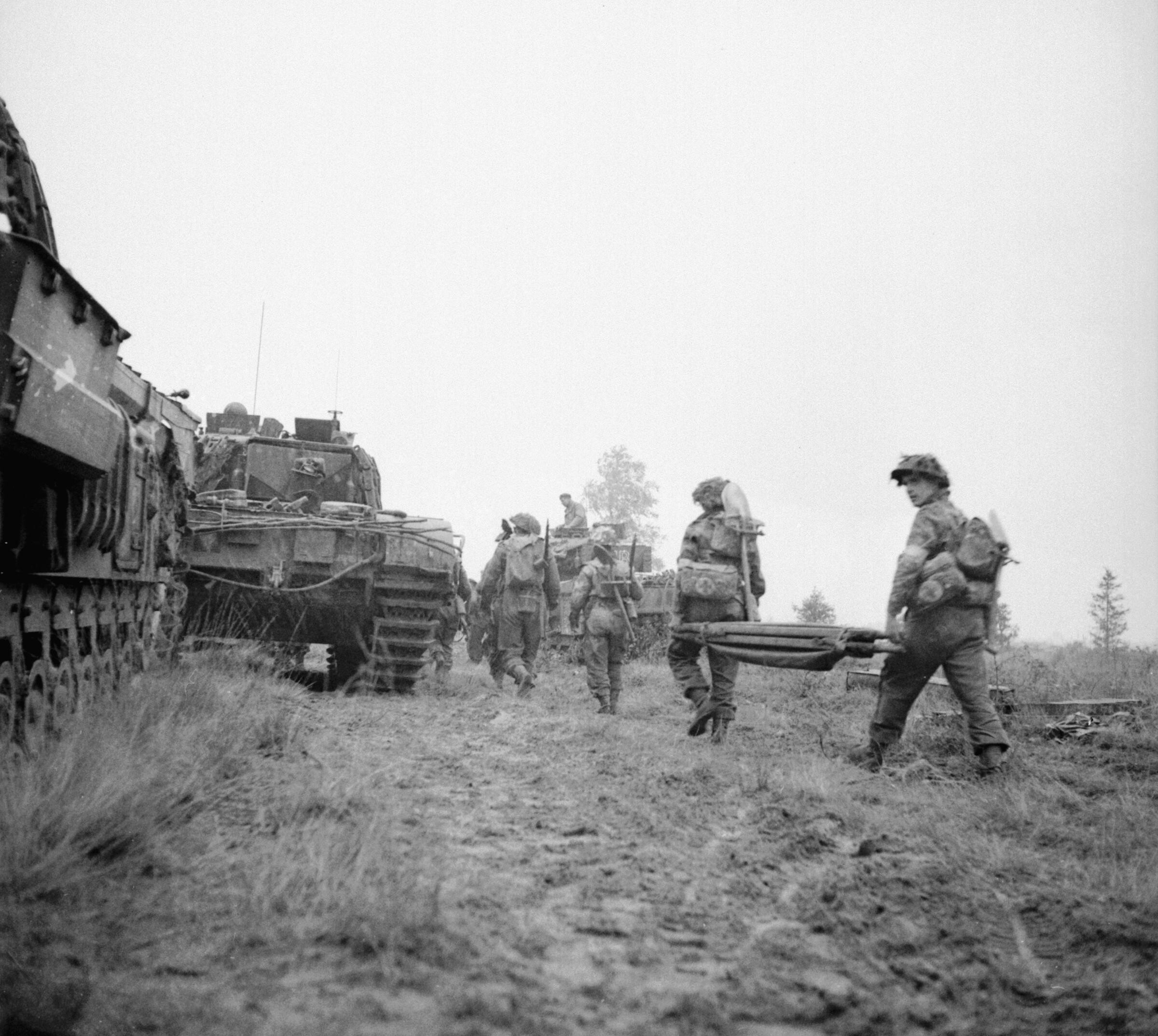
Stretcher bearers and infantrymen of the 1st Battalion, Suffolk Regiment pass Churchill tanks of the 6th Guards Tank Brigade near Venray, the Netherlands, 17 October 1944

The 1st Battalion, Suffolk Regiment was a Regular Army unit stationed in Devonport as part of the 8th Infantry Brigade, 3rd Infantry Division and served with the British Expeditionary Force (BEF) in France from late 1939 to May 1940. The division was commanded by Major-General Bernard Montgomery. With the rest of the BEF, it was evacuated from Dunkirk in 1940. The next four years were spent training in the United Kingdom for the invasion of Normandy in 1944, otherwise known as D-Day. The 1st Battalion, under the command of Lieutenant Colonel Richard E. Goodwin, landed on Sword Beach and was involved in attacking and taking the Hillman Fortress on D-Day itself. They served with the 3rd Infantry Division throughout the entire North West Europe Campaign from D-Day to Victory in Europe Day in 1945. By the end of the war the 1st Battalion had lost 215 men killed in action.

The 2nd Battalion of the Suffolk Regiment was serving in India at the outbreak of the Second World War, spending the early years of the war mainly deployed on internal security duties. In 1943 the battalion transferred to the 123rd Indian Infantry Brigade, part of the 5th Indian Infantry Division and served with them in the Burma Campaign. In 1944 the battalion was flown to Imphal to clear Japanese positions.

==== Territorial Army ====
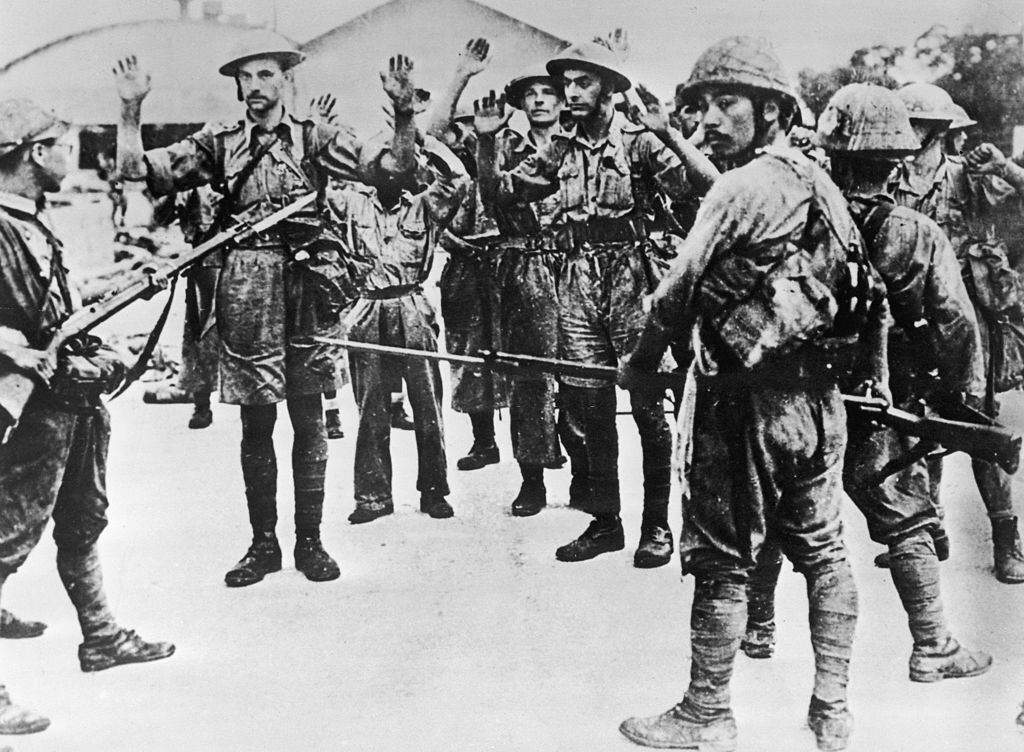
Surrendering troops of the Suffolk Regiment held at gunpoint by Japanese infantry in the battle of Singapore

The 4th/5th Battalion, Suffolk Regiment was a Territorial Army unit and was split to help re-create the 5th Battalion, which had been disbanded in the 1920s, in 1939 due to the Territorial Army being doubled as another conflict had, by this time, seemed inevitable. Both battalions were assigned to the 54th Infantry Brigade, which included the 4th Royal Norfolk Regiment, assigned to the 18th Infantry Division, a 2nd Line duplicate of the 54th (East Anglian) Infantry Division. Despite being a 2nd Line formation, the 18th Division contained many 1st Line units. The division spent the early years of the war in the defence of England and guarding against a possible German invasion after the bulk of the British Army was evacuated at Dunkirk. In late 1941 the 18th Division, the 4th and 5th Suffolks included, were originally to be sent to Egypt but instead were sent to Singapore to help strengthen the garrison there after Japan entered the war in December 1941. In early 1942, both the 4th and 5th battalions fought briefly in the defence of Singapore against the Japanese, with the 18th Division, before British Commonwealth forces on that island surrendered on 15 February 1942 under the orders of Lieutenant-General Arthur Percival. Men from the two battalions suffered great hardship as POWs and were forced to participate in the construction of the Burma Railway.

==== Hostilities-only ====
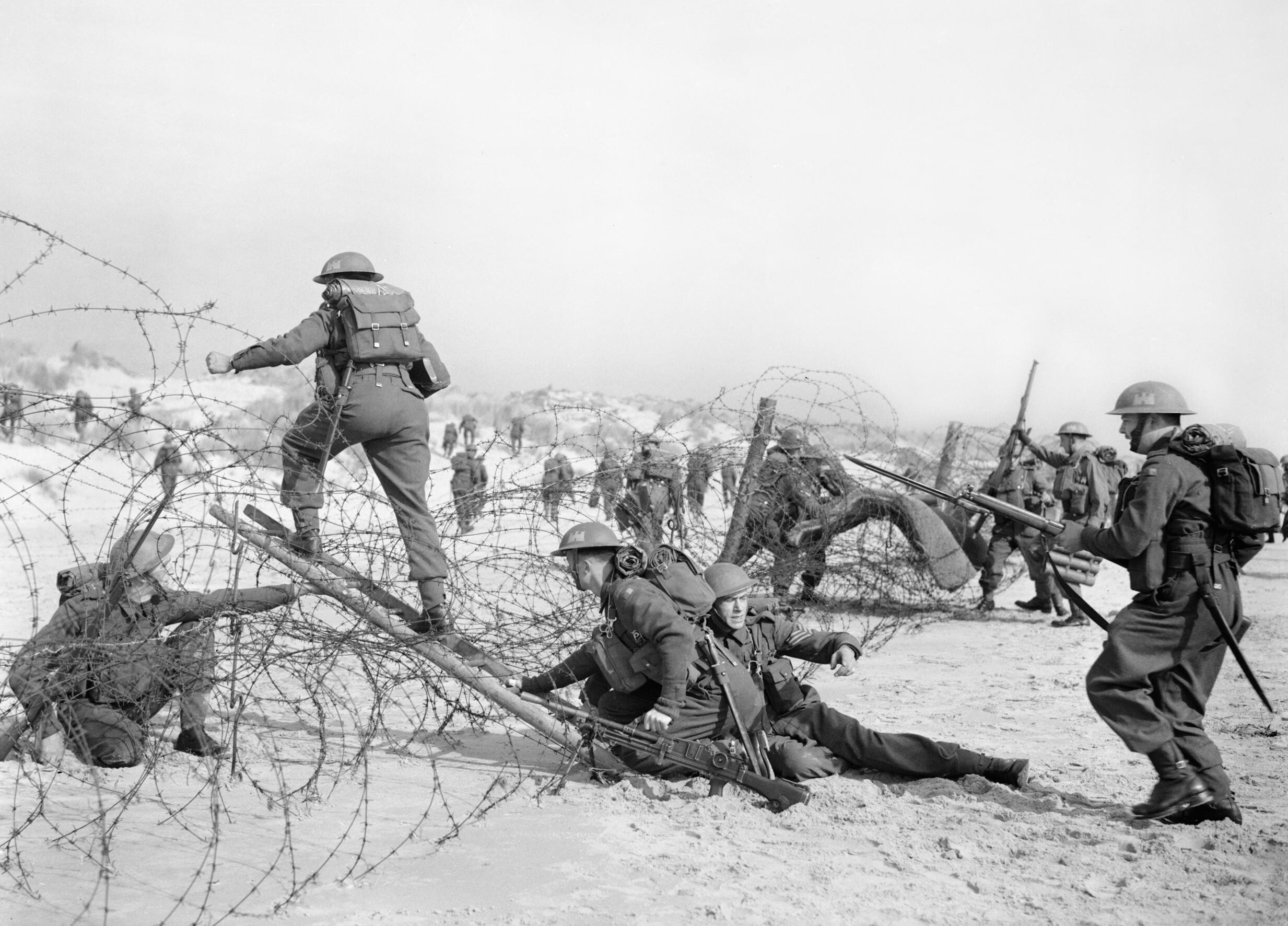
Men of the 7th Battalion, Suffolk Regiment negotiate barbed wire obstacles during training on the beach at Sandbanks near Poole, 22 March 1941.

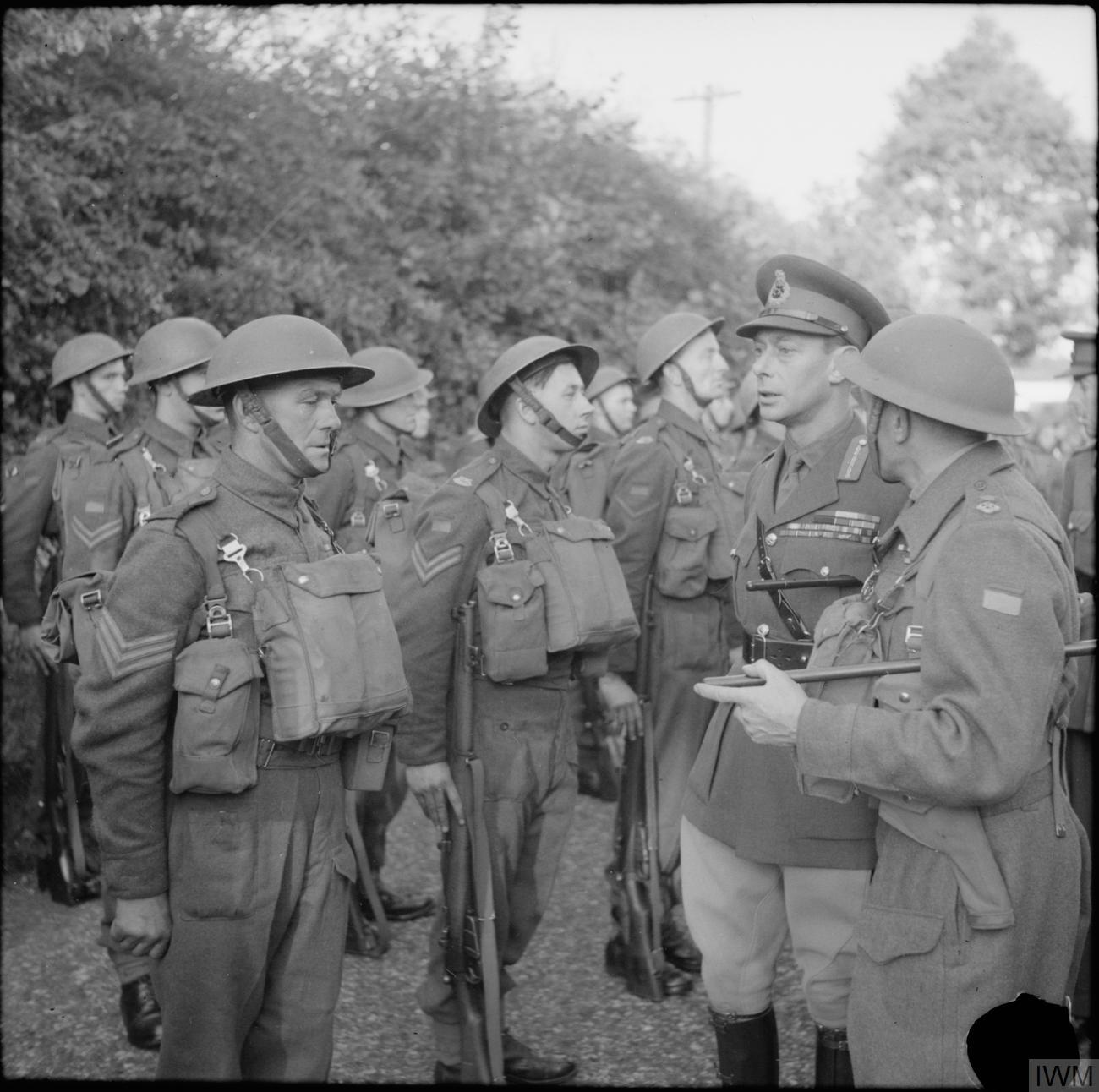
The King inspects men of the Suffolk Regiment during a tour of Western Command, 23 October 1941

The 7th Battalion, Suffolk Regiment was a war-formed unit raised in June 1940, shortly after Dunkirk, and, on 10 October, was assigned to the 210th Independent Infantry Brigade (Home) alongside other hostilities-only battalions. With the brigade, the battalion alternated between home defence duties and training to repel an expected invasion of the United Kingdom. In November 1941, with the threat of invasion reduced due to the oncoming winter, the battalion was converted to a regiment in the Royal Armoured Corps, becoming 142nd Regiment Royal Armoured Corps (142 RAC) and joined 25th Army Tank Brigade. They continued to wear their Suffolk Regiment cap badge on the black beret of the Royal Armoured Corps as did all infantry units converted this way. Equipped with Churchill tanks the regiment landed at Algiers in 1943, fighting at the Battle of Medjez-el Bab in the Tunisia Campaign in April 1943. After the end of the fighting in North Africa the regiment remained there until April 1944 when, with the rest of the brigade, it landed at Naples, Italy, destined for service in the Italian campaign, where they fought in Operation Diadem, where the Allies finally broke out of the Gustav Line. 142 RAC was present when the Allies overcame the Hitler Line and the Gothic Line in late 1944. However, due to a shortage of manpower, the regiment was disbanded in January 1945 while in northern Italy.

The 50th (Holding) Battalion was created in late May 1940, around the time of the Dunkirk evacuation, and was originally intended temporarily to 'hold' men who were medically unfit, awaiting orders, or, as this was at the time of Dunkirk, returning from overseas service. However, in October, the battalion was re-designated as the 8th Battalion. In addition, the 6th, 9th, 30th, 31st and 70th (Young Soldiers) Battalions were also formed, although none of these saw service overseas.

=== Postwar ===
The regiment was amalgamated with the Royal Norfolk Regiment to form the 1st East Anglian Regiment (Royal Norfolk and Suffolk) in 1959.

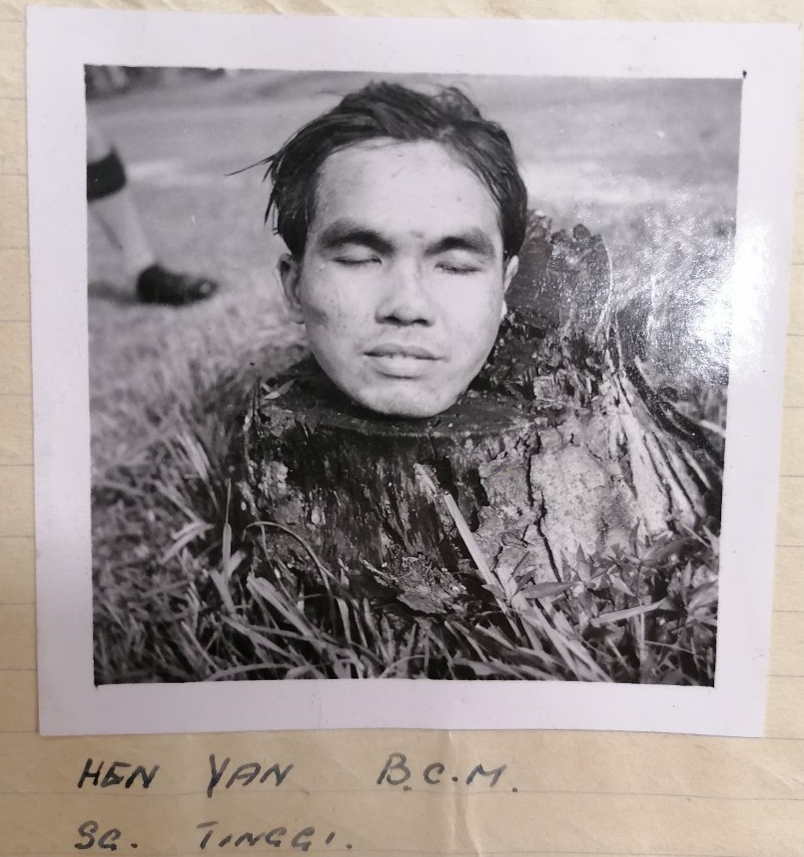
Hen Yan, a high ranking member of the MNLA, killed and decapitated by soldiers of the Suffolk Regiment.

=== Malayan Emergency ===
In 1949 the Suffolk Regiment was deployed to the Malayan Emergency. During the Malayan Emergency in April 1952, soldiers of the Suffolk Regiment killed and decapitated a socialist revolutionary and an important guerrilla of the Malayan National Liberation Army (MNLA) called Hen Yan. After the war, a former member of the Suffolk Regiment wrote a book titled The Suffolks in Malaya which described the killing but omitted any reference to the decapitation and falsely claimed Hen Yan was accompanied by five fellow guerrillas. The Suffolk Regiment killed another leading MNLA guerrilla called Liew Kon Kim.

== Regimental museum ==
The Suffolk Regiment Museum is based at Gibraltar Barracks in Bury St Edmunds.

== Battle honours ==
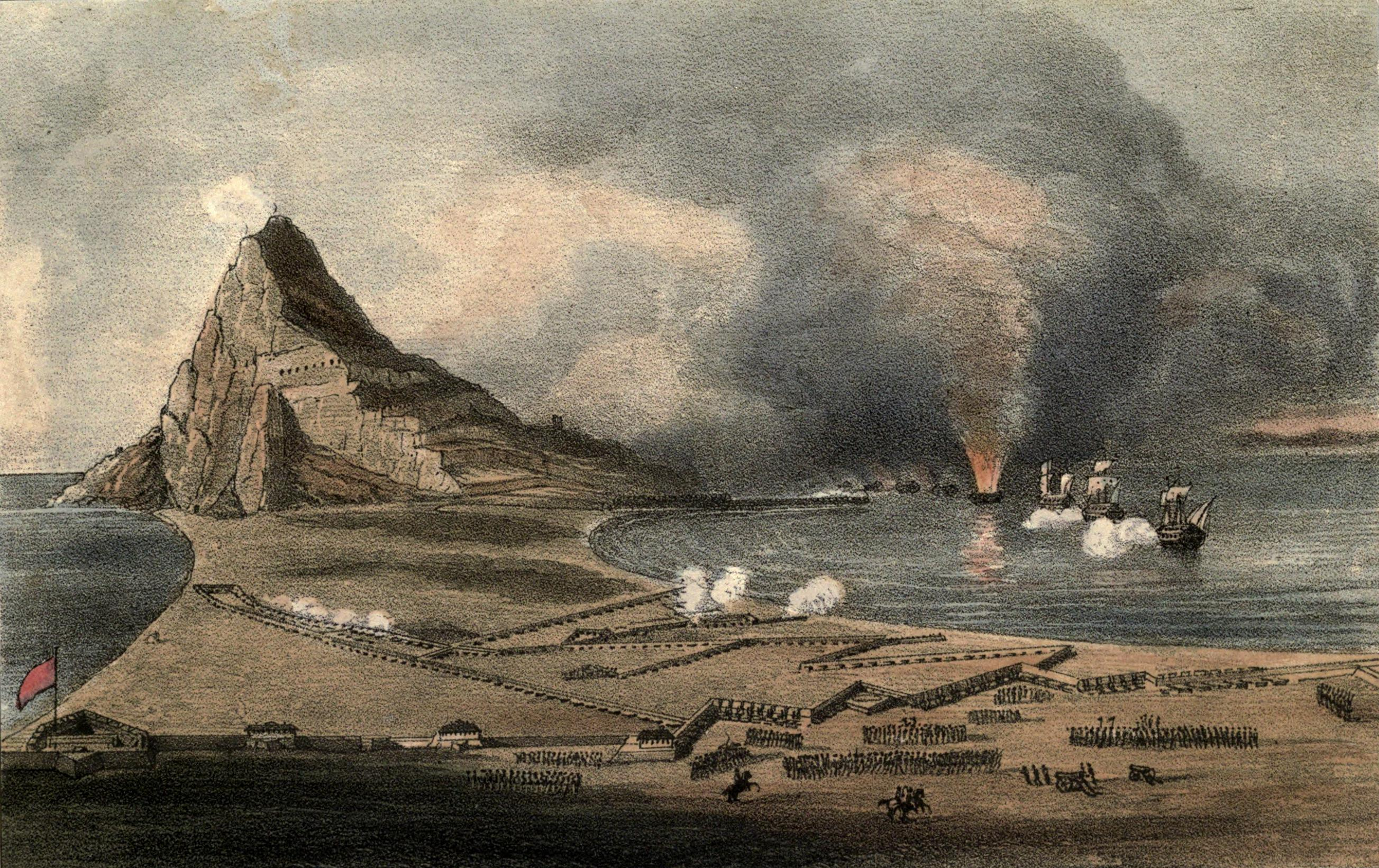
12th Regiment at the Great Siege of Gibraltar, 13–14 September 1782

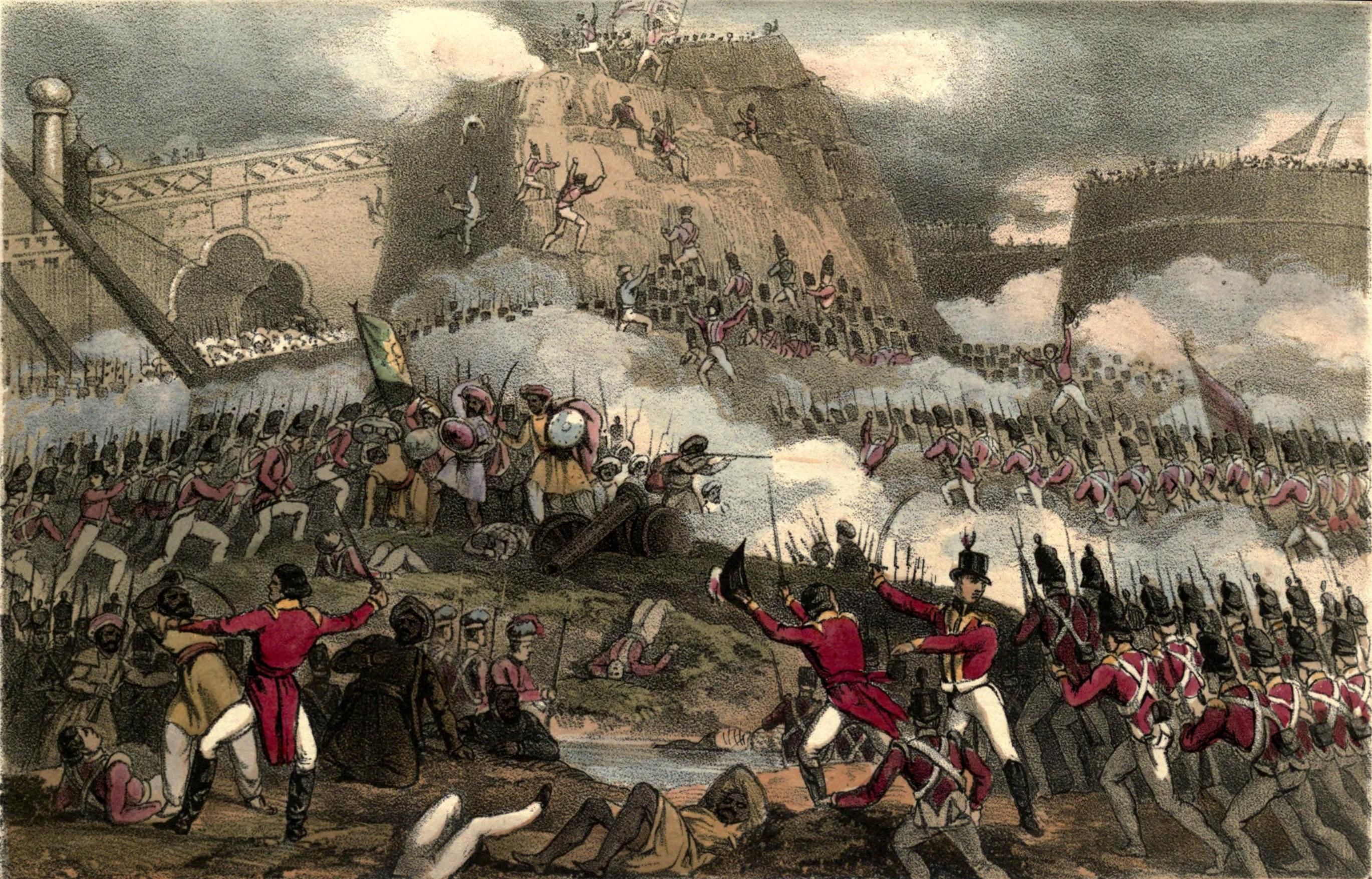
12th Regiment at the storming of Seringapatam, 4 May 1799

The regiment's battle honours were as follows:

- Early Wars
  - Dettingen, Minden, Gibraltar 1779-83, Seringapatam, South Africa 1851–52–53, New Zealand, Afghanistan 1878–80, South Africa 1899-1902
- The Great War
  - Mons, Le Cateau, Retreat from Mons, Marne 1914, Aisne 1914, La Bassée 1914, Givenchy 1914, Neuve Chapelle, Ypres 1915 '17 '18, Gravenstafel, St Julien, Frezenberg, Bellewaarde, Aubers, Hooge 1915, Loos, Somme 1916 '18, Albert 1916 '18, Bazentin, Delville Wood, Pozières, Flers-Courcelette, Morval, Thiepval, Le Transloy, Ancre Heights, Ancre 1916 '18, Arras 1917 '18, Scarpe 1917 '18, Arleux, Pilckem, Langemarck 1917, Menin Road, Polygon Wood, Poelcappelle, Passchendaele, Cambrai 1917 '18, Saint-Quentin, Bapaume 1918, Lys, Estaires, Messines 1918, Hazebrouck, Bailleul, Kemmel, Béthune, Scherpenberg, Amiens, Hindenburg Line, Épéhy, Canal du Nord, Courtrai, Selle, Valenciennes, Sambre, France and Flanders 1914–18, Struma, Doiran 1918, Macedonia 1915–18, Suvla, Landing at Suvla, Scimitar Hill, Gallipoli 1915, Egypt 1915–17, Gaza, El Mughar, Nebi Samwil, Jerusalem, Tell 'Asur, Battle of Megiddo 1918, Sharon, Palestine 1917-18
- The Second World War
  - Dunkirk 1940, Normandy Landing, Odon, Falaise, Venraij, Brinkum, North-West Europe 1940 '44-45, Singapore Island, Malaya 1942, North Arakan, Imphal, Burma 1943–45.

== Victoria Cross ==
Victoria Crosses were awarded to the following men of the regiment:

- Corporal Sidney James Day, First World War (26 August 1917)
- Sergeant Arthur Frederick Saunders, First World War (26 September 1915)

== Colonels-in-Chief ==
- 1953: Princess Margaret, Countess of Snowdon

== Colonels of the Regiment ==
Colonels of the regiment were as follows:

- 1685–1686: Col Henry Howard, 7th Duke of Norfolk
- 1686–1688: Col Edward Lee, 1st Earl of Lichfield
- 1688: Col Robert Carey, 6th Baron Hunsdon
- 1688–1689: Col Hon. Henry Wharton
- 1689–1702: Col Richard Brewer
- 1702–1712: Maj-Gen John Livesay
- 1712–1717: Lt-Gen Richard Philipps
- 1717–1725: Brig-Gen Thomas Stanwix
- 1725–1741: Gen Thomas Whetham
- 1741–1745: Col Scipio Duroure
- 1745–1757: Lt-Gen Henry Skelton

=== 12th Regiment of Foot ===
- 1757–1766: Lt-Gen Robert Napier
- 1766–1779: Gen Henry Clinton
- 1779–1811: Gen William Picton

=== 12th (East Suffolk) Regiment ===
- 1811–1823: Gen Sir Charles Hastings, 1st Baronet
- 1823–1852: Gen Hon. Robert Meade
- 1852–1857: Lt-Gen Sir Richard Goddard Hare Clarges KCB
- 1857–1864: Lt-Gen Charles Anthony Ferdinand Bentinck
- 1864–1875: Gen Henry Colvile
- 1875–1888: Gen John Patton

=== The Suffolk Regiment ===
- 1888–1900: Gen John Maxwell Perceval CB
- 1900–1904: Gen Hon Sir Percy Robert Basil Feilding KCB
- 1904–1918: Lt-Gen Hon. Bernard Matthew Ward CB
- 1918: Lt-Gen Sir Alfred Edward Codrington GCVO KCB
- 1918–1919: Lt-Gen Sir Thomas D'Oyly Snow KCB KCMG
- 1919–1925: Gen Sir Thomas Lethbridge Napier Morland KCB KCMG DSO
- 1925–1939: Maj-Gen Sir John Ponsonby KCB CMG DSO
- 1939–1947: Col Walter Norris Nicholson CMG DSO
- 1947–1957: Brig Edward Henry Walford Backhouse CBE
- 1957–1959: Brig Richard Hobson Maxwell CB

== See also ==
- Battle of the Eureka Stockade

== Sources ==
- Bell, K.M (2007). A Private from the Suffolk Regiment (an unpublished manuscript). Suffolk Records Office Reference GB554/Y/515.
- Bird, Antony (2008). Gentlemen, We Will Stand and Fight. Crowood. ISBN 978-1847970626.
- Cannon, Richard (1848). Historical record of the 12th or the East Suffolk Regiment of Foot. Parker, Furnivall & Parker.
- Clark, Manning (1987). A History of Australia. Vol. IV: The Earth Abideth Forever 1851-1888. Carlton: Melbourne University Press. ISBN 9780522841473.
- Corfield, Justin; Wickham, Dorothy; Gervasoni, Clare (2004). The Eureka Encyclopedia. Ballarat: Ballarat Heritage Services. ISBN 978-1-87-647861-2.
- Joanna Costin, Cambridgeshire Kitcheners: A History of the 11th (Service) Battalion (Cambs) Suffolk Regiment, Barnsley: Pen & Sword, 2016, ISBN 978-1-4738-6900-4
- Delaforce, Patrick (1995). Monty's Iron Sides. Stroud: Alan Sutton. ISBN 0-7509-0781-9.
- Farmer, John S. (1984). The Regimental Records of the British Army. Bristol: Crecy Books. ISBN 0 947554 03 3.
- George Forty, British Army Handbook 1939–1945, Stroud: Sutton, 1998, ISBN 0-7509-1403-3.
- J.B.M. Frederick, Lineage Book of British Land Forces 1660–1978, Vol I, Wakefield: Microform Academic, 1984, ISBN 1-85117-007-3.
- Brig E.A. James, British Regiments 1914–18, London: Samson Books, 1978, ISBN 0-906304-03-2/Uckfield: Naval & Military Press, 2001, ISBN 978-1-84342-197-9.
- Murphy, Charles Cecil Rowe (1928). The History of the Suffolk Regiment, 1914-1927. London: Hutchinson. OCLC 13429897.
- Scarfe, Norman (2006). Assault Division: A History of the 3rd Division from the Invasion of Normandy to the Surrender of Germany. Stroud, Gloucestershire, Spellmount. ISBN 1-86227-338-3.
- Lt-Col E.A.H. Webb, History of the 12th (The Suffolk) Regiment 1685–1913, London: Spottiswoode, 1914/Uckfield: Naval & Military, 2001, ISBN 978-1-84342-116-0.

=== External links ===
- Chris Baker, The Long, Long Trail
- "Battle of Fontenoy". British Battles.
- Lummis, Eric. "The History of the Suffolk Regiment". Suffolk Regiment.
- T.F. Mills, Land Forces of Britain, the Empire and Commonwealth – Regiments.org (archived at the Wayback Machine)
- Suffolk Regiment Museum Website
- Friends of the Suffolk Regiment
- Friends of the Suffolk Regiment - Museum Information
- Regimental history from the St. Edmundsbury Borough Council

Preceded by 12th Regiment of Foot	The Suffolk Regiment; 1782–1959	Succeeded by 1st East Anglian Regiment
