= Henry Wharton (soldier) =

Henry Wharton was an English soldier known for his service in the Williamite War in Ireland, where he died in 1689. He was a distant relation of his namesake the writer Henry Wharton.

== Life ==
Wharton was the son of Philip Wharton, 4th Baron Wharton. He was first commissioned into the English Army in 1674 during the reign of Charles II. During the reign of James II, while still a Captain, he was an active participant in the conspiracy against the King which also included his father and brother Thomas Wharton. During the Glorious Revolution in 1688 he was one of a number of army officers who defected to William III's invading Dutch Army at Exeter. After the Revolution he was promoted to command the old regiment of Lord Lichfield.

Wharton's regiment was reformed and sent to Ireland, where Jacobite supporters of King James still held power. In August 1689 Wharton and his regiment landed in County Down as part of Marshal Schomberg's expedition and were tasked with securing Belfast whose Jacobite garrison had abandoned the town. Wharton's men subsequently participated in the successful Siege of Carrickfergus. During the final negotiations for surrender, Wharton's troops remained poised to assault the town as an inducement for the Jacobites to agree terms. On 28 October 1689 he died of illness at Dundalk Camp, during the stand-off between the rival armies of Schomberg and James II. He was one of thousands of Williamite casualties, who suffered from exposure in the climate during their time at Dundalk.

After Wharton's death, his regiment came under the command of Richard Brewer and served in Flanders during the Nine Years' War. He developed a reputation as both a notorious duellist and womaniser. In 1686 he killed Lieutenant Robert Moxon, an Irish Catholic officer in his own regiment in a duel.

== Bibliography ==
- Childs, John. The Army, James II and the Glorious Revolution. Manchester University Press, 1980.
- Childs, John. The British Army of William III, 1689-1702. Manchester University Press, 1987.
- Childs, John. The Williamite War in Ireland, 1688-1691. Continuum, 2007.
- Wilson, John Harold. Court Satires of the Restoration. Ohio State University Press, 1976.

Military offices
Preceded by The Lord Hunsdon	Colonel of Wharton's Regiment of Foot; 1688–1689	Succeeded by Richard Brewer
