= Sidney James Day =

- Born: 3 July 1891; Norwich, Norfolk
- Died: 17 July 1959 (aged 68); Portsmouth, Hampshire, England
- Burial place: Milton Cemetery, Portsmouth, Hampshire, England
- Military career
- Allegiance: United Kingdom
- Branch: British Army
- Rank: Corporal
- Units: Suffolk Regiment
- Conflicts: World War I
- Awards: Victoria Cross

Corporal Sidney James Day VC (3 July 1891 – 17 July 1959) was a British Army soldier and an English recipient of the Victoria Cross (VC), the highest and most prestigious award for gallantry in the face of the enemy that can be awarded to a British or Commonwealth serviceman.

While serving as a corporal in the 11th (Service) Battalion, Suffolk Regiment, British Army during the First World War, he was seriously wounded during the Battle of the Somme in 1916 and invalided back to England, spending several months in hospital. Upon discharge, he returned to duty in Northern France.

On 26 August 1917, east of Hargicourt, France, Day was in command of a bombing section detailed to clear a maze of trenches still held by the enemy; this he did, killing two machine gunners and taking four prisoners. Immediately after he returned to his section, a stick bomb fell into a trench occupied by five men, one badly wounded. The corporal seized the bomb and threw it over the trench where it immediately exploded. He afterwards completed the clearing of the trench and established himself in an advanced position, remaining for 66 hours at his post, which came under intense fire.

== Death ==
He died in Queen Alexandra's Hospital on 17 July 1959, aged 68, and is buried in Milton Cemetery, Portsmouth.

== Bibliography ==
- Gliddon, Gerald (2004) [2012]. VCs of the First World War: Cambrai 1917. The History Press. ISBN 978-0-75-247668-1.
