= Dundalk Camp =

1689 military encampment

Dundalk Camp was a military camp which served as the headquarters of the Williamite Army under Marshal Schomberg in Autumn 1689 as part of the Williamite War in Ireland. The camp rapidly became notorious for the great loss of life suffered by soldiers due to the exposed conditions, shortage of supplies and inadequate medical facilities.

Following victories including the relief of Derry and the capture of Carrickfergus, Schomberg marched his forces south from Ulster. Arriving on 7 September 1689, Schomberg established his camp close to the town of Dundalk in County Louth. He did not originally intend to stay long there, but instead use it as a staging post on the way to the capital at Dublin. However, a shortage of supplies led to delays. Between September and November, 5,674 troops died of illness.

After a stand off with the Jacobite Irish Army under James II ended without a major battle being fought, Schomberg abandoned any plans of a further advance. His troops went into winter quarters, dispersed across Ulster. William of Orange was angered by Schomberg's lack of activity and decided to personally take command in Ireland the following year.

For the 1690 campaign thousands of reinforcements had to be shipped in to replace those lost at Dundalk. This Army then went on to victory at the Battle of the Boyne in July and the capture of Dublin.

== Bibliography ==
- Childs, John. The Williamite Wars in Ireland. Bloomsbury Publishing, 2007.
- Bartlett, Thomas & Jeffrey, Keith. A Military History of Ireland. Cambridge University Press, 1996.
