= Edward Strong (disambiguation) =

Edward Strong (1901–1990) was an American academic administrator.

Edward Strong may also refer to:

- Edward Strong the Elder (1652–1724), British sculptor
- Edward Strong the Younger (1676–1741), British sculptor
- Edward Kellogg Strong Jr. (1884–1963), American psychologist
- Eddie Strong (born 1936), English athlete
