= Montagu House, Bloomsbury =

17th-century mansion in London, which became the first home of the British Museum

Coordinates: 51.519319°N 0.126933°W

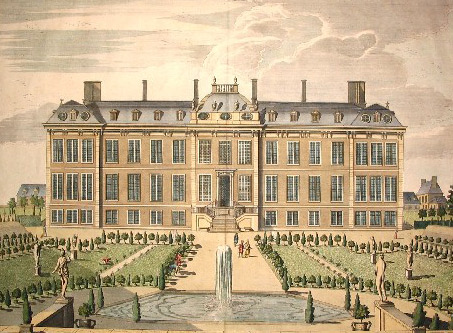
The garden front of Montagu House.

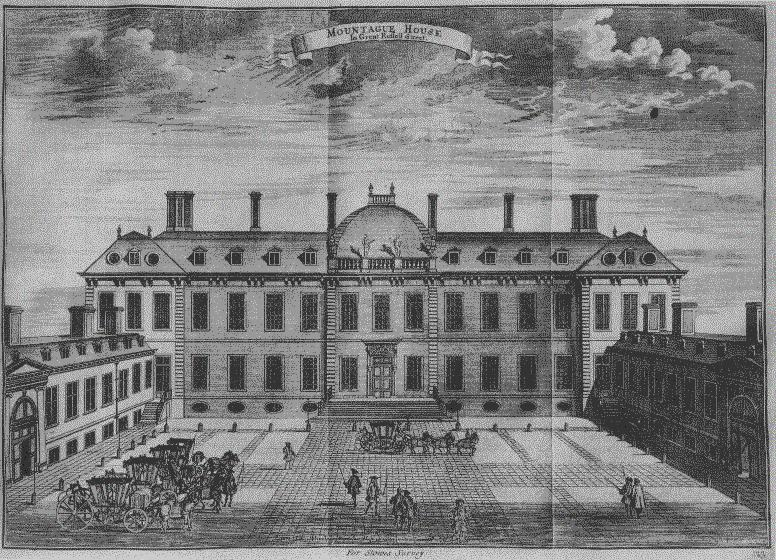
The entrance front.

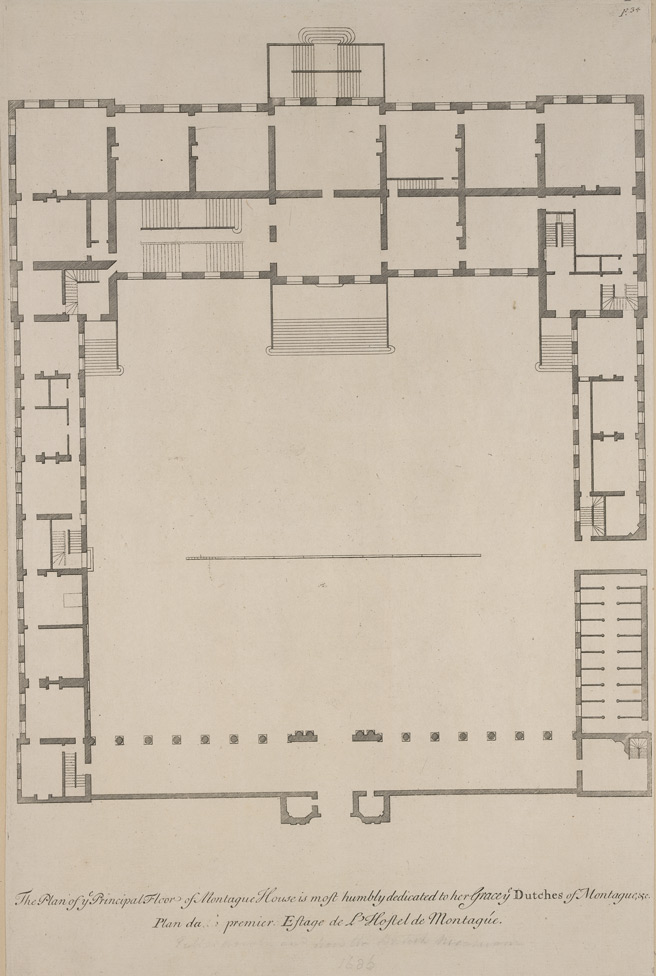
A plan of Montagu House from Colen Campbell's Vitruvius Britannicus.

Montagu House (sometimes spelled "Montague") was a late 17th-century mansion in Great Russell Street in the Bloomsbury district of London, which became the first home of the British Museum. The first house on the site was destroyed by fire in 1686. The rebuilt house was sold to the British Museum in 1759, and demolished in the 1840s to make way for the present larger building.

== Construction ==
The house was actually built twice, both times for the same man, Ralph Montagu, 1st Duke of Montagu. The late 17th century was Bloomsbury's most fashionable era, and Montagu purchased a site which is now in the heart of London but which then backed onto open fields (the Long Fields).

=== First house ===
His first house was designed by the English architect and scientist Robert Hooke, an architect of moderate ability whose style was influenced by French planning and Dutch detailing, and was built between 1675 and 1679. Admired by contemporaries, it had a central block and two service blocks flanking a large courtyard and featured murals by the Italian artist Antonio Verrio. The French painter Jacques Rousseau also contributed wall paintings. In 1686, the house was destroyed by fire.

=== Second house ===
The house was rebuilt to the designs of the less known French architect Pierre Puget. This Montagu House was by some margin the grandest private residence constructed in London in the last two decades of the 17th century. The main façade was of seventeen bays, with a slightly projecting three bay centre and three bay ends, which abutted the service wings of the first mansion. The house was of two main storeys, plus basement and a prominent mansard roof with a dome over the centre. The planning was in the usual French form of the time, with state apartments leading from a central saloon. The interiors, decorated by French artists, were admired by Horace Walpole and were probably comparable to the surviving state apartments at Boughton House in Northamptonshire, which were built for the same patron at the same time.

== History ==
In the early 18th century, Bloomsbury began to decline gently from a fashionable aristocratic district to a more middle-class enclave, and the 2nd Duke of Montagu abandoned his father's house to move to Whitehall. He built himself a more modest residence which was later replaced with an opulent mansion by his Victorian descendant, Walter Montagu Douglas Scott, 5th Duke of Buccleuch: see Montagu House, Whitehall. Montagu House in Bloomsbury was sold to the Trustees of the British Museum in 1759 and was the home of that institution until it was demolished in the 1840s to make way for larger premises.

== Reception ==
In 1734, the London weekly The Weekly Register condemned Montagu House as “a strange instance of mistaken grandeur”, calling its interiors “a scene of grandeur … intended to glut the eye with entertainment”.

== In popular culture ==
In fiction, the House appears in Neal Stephenson's The Baroque Cycle as Ravenscar House with Daniel Waterhouse as the architect in place of Hooke and in the novel The Secret Diaries of Charles Ignatius Sancho by Paterson Joseph.

== See also ==
- Montagu House, Whitehall
- Montagu House, Portman Square
- Montagu House, Blackheath
- Charles de La Fosse
- Noble Households – book with Montagu House inventories, 1709 and 1733

== Bibliography ==
- Colvin, Howard, A Biographical Dictionary of British Architects, 1600–1840. New Haven, CT.; London: Yale University Press for the Paul Mellon Centre for Studies in British Art, 2008 ISBN 978-0-300-12508-5 OCLC 84996007
- Cornforth, John, Early Georgian Interiors. New Haven, CT.; London: Yale University Press for the Paul Mellon Centre for Studies in British Art, 2004, pp. 116, 183 ISBN 978-0-30-010330-4 OCLC 938151474
- Murdoch, Tessa (ed.), Noble Households: Eighteenth-Century Inventories of Great English Houses. A Tribute to John Cornforth. Cambridge: John Adamson, 2006, pp. 11–48 ISBN 978-0-9524322-5-8 OCLC 78044620
- Pearce, David, London's Mansions: The Palatial Houses of the Nobility. London, B. T. Batsford, 2001 ISBN 978-0-7134-8702-2 OCLC 46984772
