= Montagu House, Whitehall =

Palace in the United Kingdom

Coordinates: 51°30′23″N 0°7′35″W

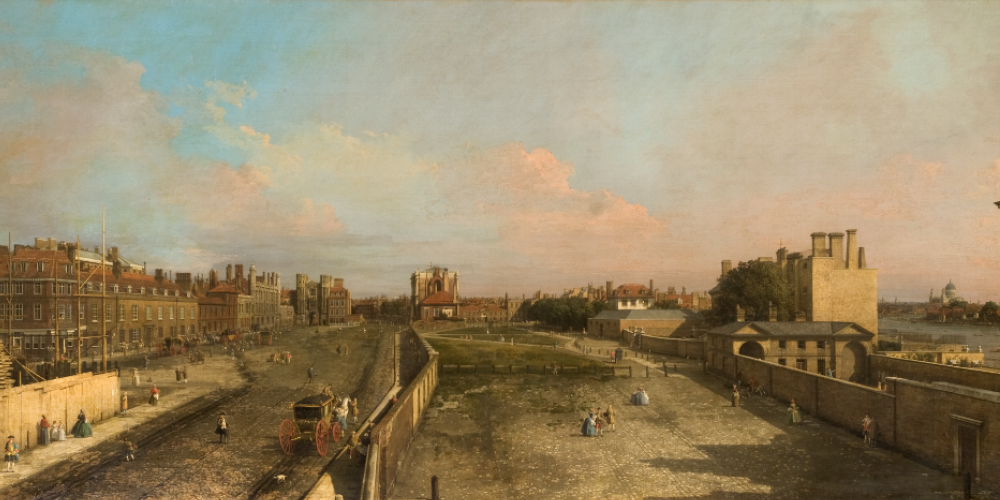
Montagu House at right, in Canaletto's Whitehall, looking North, viewed from Richmond House, painted after 1747. At far right is part of the stables of Richmond House; left: Holbein Gate left over from the Palace of Whitehall; centre: the Privy Garden and the Banqueting House

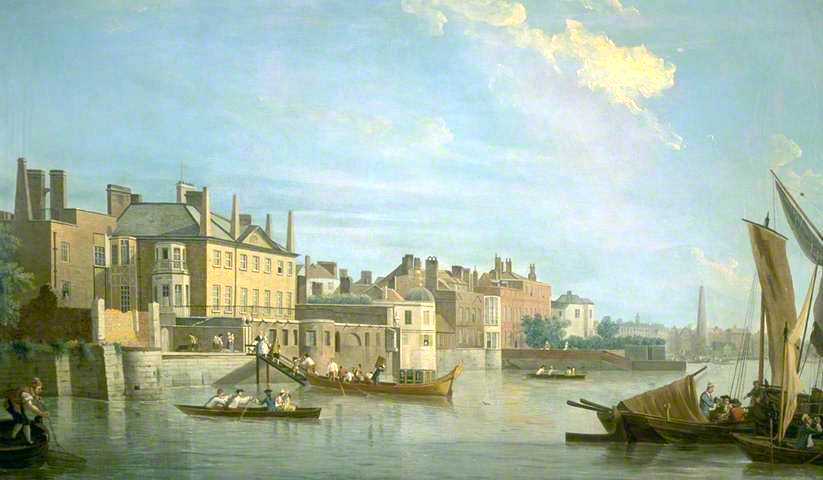
Montagu House is the seven-bay house at left with a pediment in this view of the Thames painted by Samuel Scott in 1750.

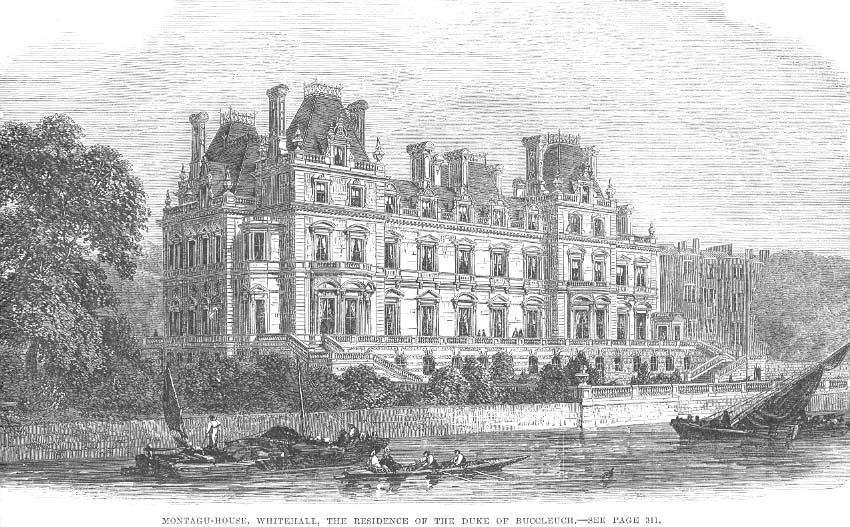
The Victorian Montagu House. Wood-engraving from the Illustrated London News (1864).

Montagu House in Whitehall, Westminster, London, England, was the town house built by John Montagu, 2nd Duke of Montagu (1690–1749), whose country seat was Boughton House in Northamptonshire.

== History ==
In 1731, John Montagu, 2nd Duke of Montagu, abandoned the existing grand Montagu House in the socially declining district of Bloomsbury, which was later to become the premises of the British Museum, and purchased a site that had once been occupied by the Archbishops of York's London residence and had later been part of the site of Whitehall Palace. He built himself a relatively modest mansion in the conventional style of the day, which can be seen in Canaletto's painting of Whitehall.

In the late 1850s, the 2nd Duke of Montagu's descendant, Walter Montagu Douglas Scott, 5th Duke of Buccleuch, one of the United Kingdom's three or four richest landowners, replaced the Georgian house with one of the grandest private mansions in London. It was designed by the versatile Scottish architect William Burn in the style of a French Renaissance chateau. The building was admired in its day. It was built of Portland stone, with a steep mansard roof, corner towers and a skyline peppered with stone chimneys. The interior featured a top-lit central saloon and a grand staircase, heavily coffered ceilings and elaborately carved furnishings. It housed part of the exceptional Buccleuch art collection, including works by Rubens and Rembrandt and the finest British collection of miniatures apart from the Royal Collection. Princess Alice, Duchess of Gloucester, was born there in 1901.

In 1917 the house was taken over for use as government offices, and its owner John Montagu Douglas Scott, 7th Duke of Buccleuch took a new London townhouse at No. 2 Grosvenor Place. In 1949–50 Montagu House was demolished. The site forms roughly the southern half of that of the current main Ministry of Defence building in Whitehall.

== See also ==
- Montagu House, Bloomsbury
- Montagu House, Portman Square
- Montagu House, Blackheath
- List of demolished buildings and structures in London
- Noble Households – book with Montagu House, Whitehall, inventory of 1746
