= Etchinghill =

Etchinghill may refer to the following places in England:

- Etchinghill, Kent
- Etchinghill, Staffordshire
