= Marlborough House =

Mansion in the City of Westminster, London, England

Coordinates: 51°30′18″N 0°8′9″W

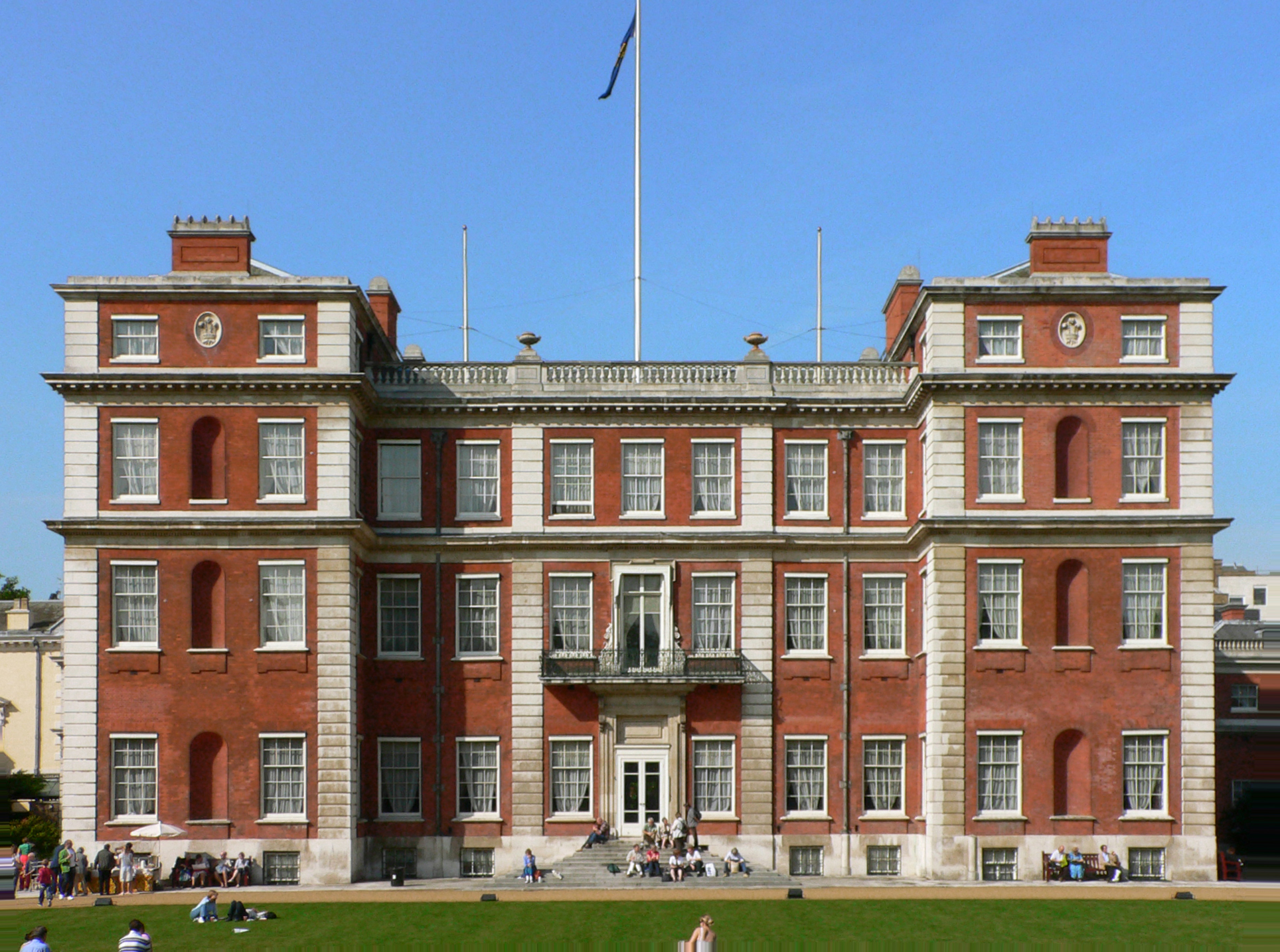
- The south façade of Marlborough House

- Location within City of Westminster
- Location: London, SW1Y 5HX

History
- Built: 1711; 315 years ago

Site notes
- Architect: Christopher Wren
- Owner: King Charles III in the right of The Crown

Listed Building – Grade I
- Designated: 5 February 1970
- Reference no.: 1331701

Marlborough House, a Grade I listed mansion on The Mall in St James's, City of Westminster, London, is the headquarters of the Commonwealth of Nations and the seat of the Commonwealth Secretariat. It is adjacent to St James's Palace.

The house was built in 1711 for Sarah Churchill, Duchess of Marlborough, the favourite and confidante of Queen Anne. For over a century it served as the London residence of the dukes of Marlborough. It became a royal residence throughout the 19th century and first half of the 20th. The house was expanded for the Prince of Wales, the future King Edward VII, and became closely associated with the prince and his Marlborough House set in the Victorian era. His daughter-in-law, later Queen Mary, lived there when she was Princess of Wales and took a special, continuing interest in the house; she, like her mother-in-law Queen Alexandra before her, returned to live there in her widowhood and memorials to both queens are on its grounds. The building was leased by Queen Elizabeth II to the Commonwealth Secretariat beginning in 1965.

== Construction ==
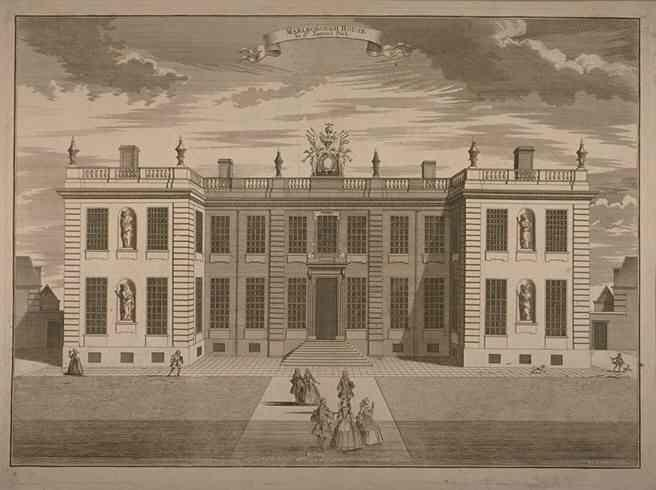
In its original form Marlborough House had just two storeys. This illustration of c.1750 shows the garden front.

In 1708, John Churchill, 1st Duke of Marlborough was granted a 50-year lease from Queen Anne, at a low rent from the Crown, of a site that had beforehand been partly occupied by the pheasantry adjoining St. James's Palace, and partly by the gardens of Henry Boyle, Queen Anne's Secretary of State. The Duke left his wife entirely in charge of the design and building of Marlborough House; she wanted her new home to be "strong, plain and convenient and good". The architect Christopher Wren and his son of the same name designed a two-story brick building with rusticated stone quoins that was completed in 1711. The stonework and ornamentation were built by Edward Strong the Younger a friend of Christopher Wren the Younger. The Duke purchased the bricks cheaply in Holland while on campaign, and had them transported to England as ballast in the empty troop ships on their return journeys from depositing British troops. Throughout the building process, the Duchess kept a close watch on even the smallest details and quarreled with the Wrens over the contractors they had hired. This led John Vanbrugh to joke that the Duchess had "the direction in chief to herself, with Sir Christopher Wren as her Deputy Surveyor." Eventually she dismissed the Wrens and took control of the design herself.

In 1727, Sarah's political rival Sir Robert Walpole purchased the lot between Marlborough House and Pall Mall through his protégé Thomas Ripley, reputedly to deny the Duchess a direct entrance onto Pall Mall. Wren had designed and built a gateway arch and screen in the front courtyard with this entrance in mind, which survives as a grotto. Still intent on an entrance from Pall Mall, in 1729 the Duchess leased four houses to the west and had them demolished to create a "poky" diagonal entrance.

In the 1770s, George Spencer, 4th Duke of Marlborough hired the architect Sir William Chambers to add a third storey to the house and architectural details like new ceilings and chimneypieces.

== Royal residence ==
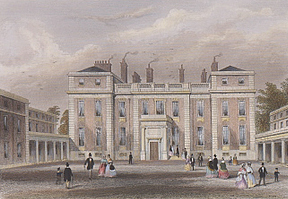
This view of the entrance front published in the 1850s before Pennethorne's additions shows an additional storey on the wings. The wings later gained a fourth main storey, and the central section gained a third.

After the fourth duke's death in 1817 ownership was taken up by the Crown so the building could be used as the residence of Princess Charlotte of Wales and her husband Leopold of Saxe-Coburg-Saalfeld, the location of the house (north of The Mall and east of St James's Palace) making it convenient as a Royal Residence. The Princess died before the purchase was completed, and so her widower lived there alone for some time. He was offered the Belgian throne in the house on 22 April 1831. In the 1820s plans were drawn up to demolish Marlborough House and replace it with a terrace of similar dimensions to the two in neighbouring Carlton House Terrace, and this idea even featured on some contemporary maps, including Christopher and John Greenwood's large-scale London map of 1830, but the proposal was not implemented.

After Leopold became King of Belgium and left Britain, Marlborough House continued to be primarily used by members of the royal family, Queen Adelaide being given the use of Marlborough House from 1831 until her death in 1849. Following Queen Adelaide's death, Queen Victoria asked Parliament to allow the Prince of Wales to live there when he turned nineteen. From May to September 1852, the Museum of Manufactures, a predecessor of the Victoria & Albert Museum, housed its collections in Marlborough House. From 1853 to 1861 Prince Albert arranged for the building to be used by the "National Art Training School", later the Royal College of Art.

From 1861 to 1863, Sir James Pennethorne substantially enlarged the structure by adding a range of rooms on the north side and a deep porch for the Prince and Princess of Wales, later King Edward VII and Queen Alexandra, who made their home the social centre of London. Their second son, the future King George V, was born at Marlborough House in 1865, and the family lived there until Queen Victoria died in 1901, when Edward acceded to the throne and they moved to nearby Buckingham Palace. From the 1880s the term ‘Marlborough House Set’ came into usage to denote the Prince of Wales's fast-living social circle, which included gamblers, bankers, and other "raffish" individuals.

After his father moved to Buckingham Palace in 1901, Edward VII's son George, now Prince of Wales, took up residence with his wife Mary and their children. Mary extensively redecorated to make the home more comfortable, and was reluctant to move to Buckingham Palace after her husband became George V in 1910. Following this, Queen Alexandra once again made Marlborough House her London home, until her death in 1925. A late Art Nouveau-Gothic memorial fountain by Alfred Gilbert (1926–32) in the Marlborough Road wall of the house commemorates her.

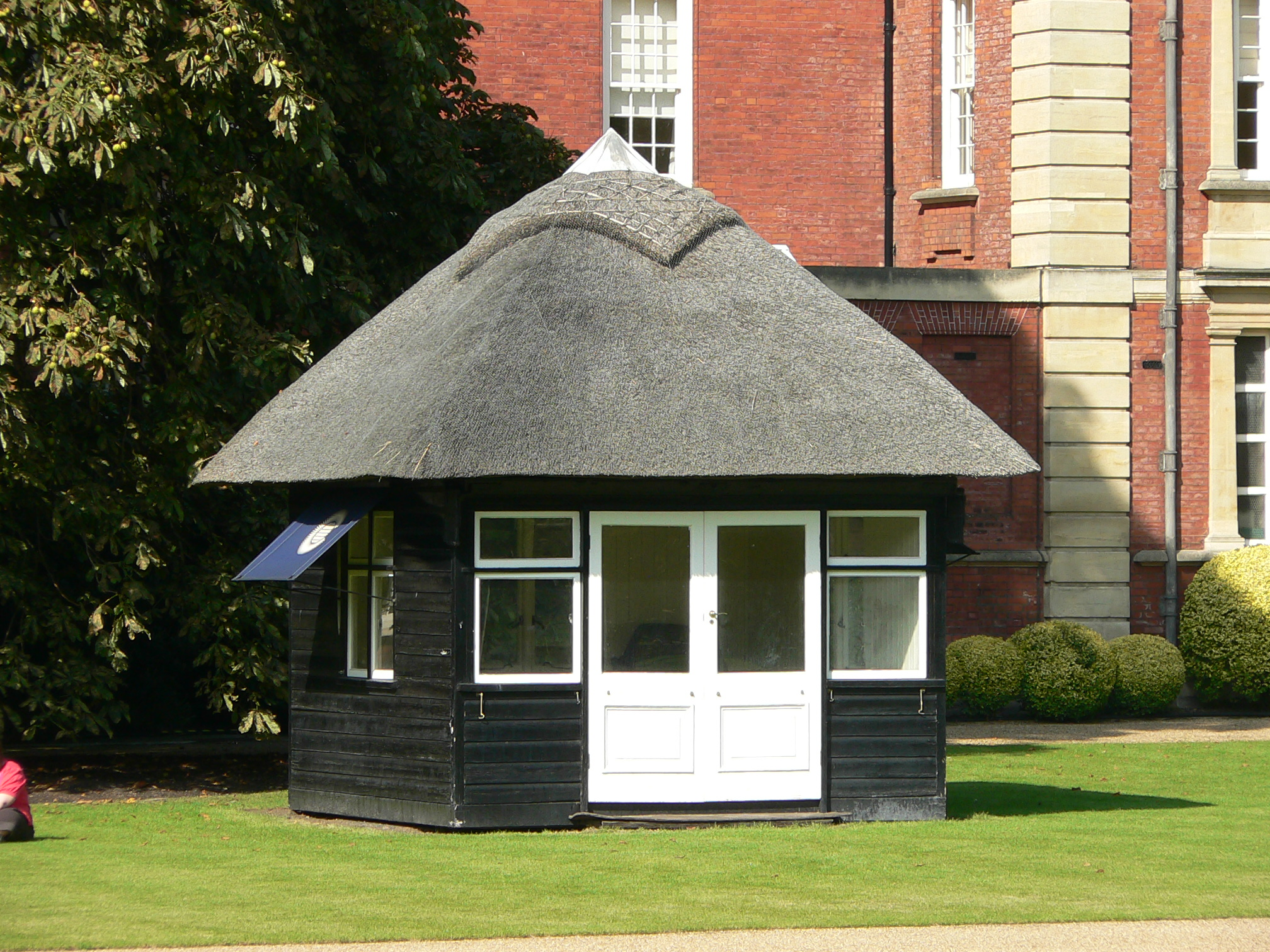
Marlborough House – Rotating Summer House

In 1936, Marlborough House became the London residence of George V's widow, Queen Mary, who survived George by 17 years. In the grounds of the house remains her pet cemetery. A thatch-roofed rotating summer house built for her is still in place. A plaque to commemorate Queen Mary was unveiled in 1967.

== Commonwealth Secretariat ==
After Queen Mary's death in 1953, Marlborough House continued to be used by various members of the royal family as a London residence before Queen Elizabeth II leased it to the Commonwealth Secretariat in 1965, an arrangement which continues today.

The Gambia Independence Act 1964 was signed at Marlborough House, before its independence on 18 February 1965.

== Features ==
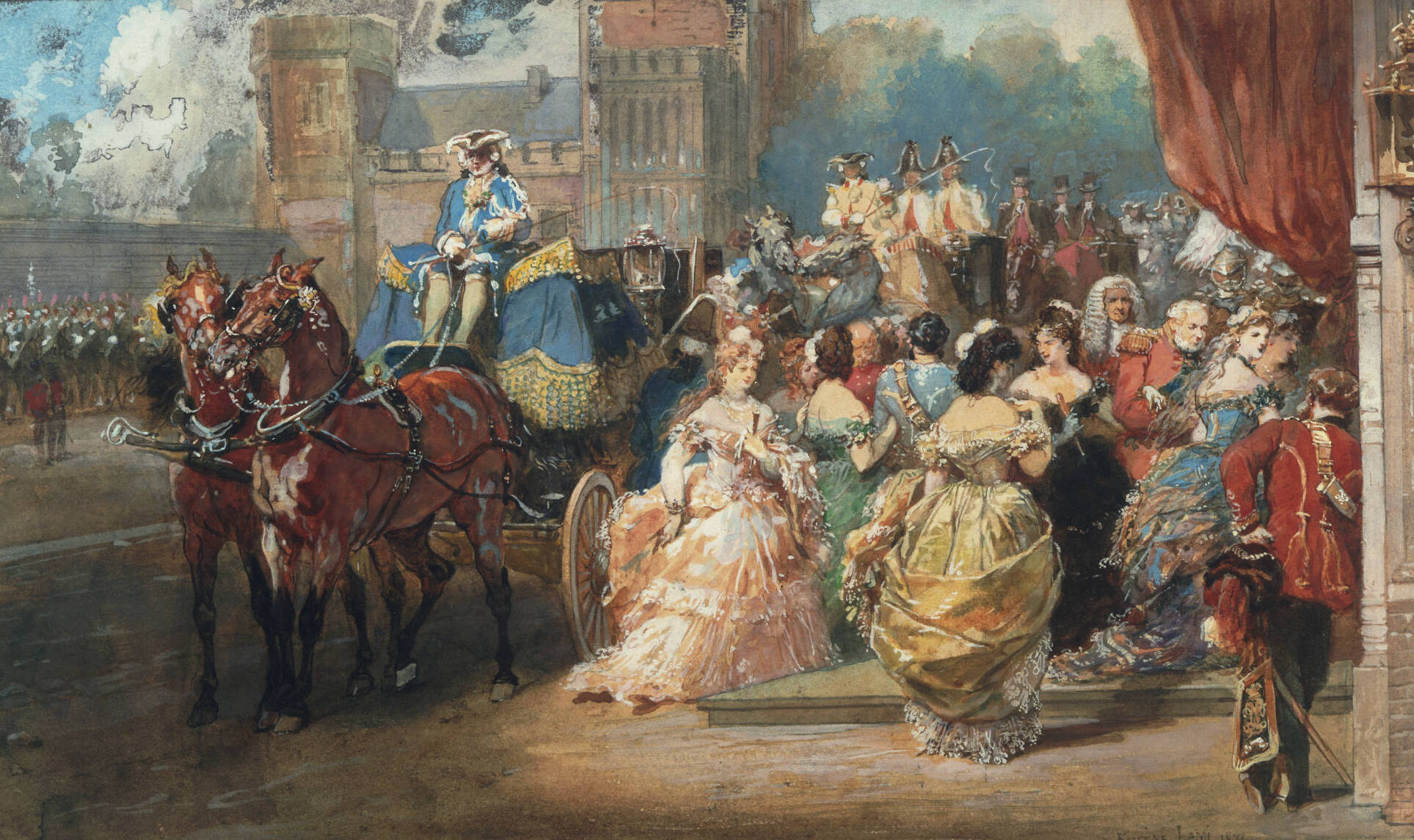
Eugène Lami, Entry to a Drawing Room at Marlborough House, 1871, Princeton University Art Museum

The nearly cubical saloon retains wall-paintings by Louis Laguerre of the Battle of Blenheim (at which the 1st Duke of Marlborough was overall commander for Britain and her allies; seat of the dukes of Marlborough is Blenheim Palace, one of England's largest houses). A cupola inserted in the ceiling is surrounded by paintings by Orazio Gentileschi and Artemisia Gentileschi for the Queen's House, Greenwich, 1636. There are paired staircases flanking the saloon, with further battle pieces by Laguerre. Most of the interiors have been altered.

== Public opening times ==
Marlborough House is usually open to the public for Open House Weekend each September. The house is also open for group tours by prior arrangement.

== See also ==
- Noble Households – book with Marlborough House inventory of 1740

== Bibliography ==
- Cornforth, John (2004). Early Georgian Interiors. New Haven, Conn.; London: Yale University Press for the Paul Mellon Centre for Studies in British Art, pp. 134, 275. ISBN 978-0-30-010330-4. OCLC 938151474
- Murdoch, Tessa (ed.) (2006). Noble Households: Eighteenth-Century Inventories of Great English Houses. A Tribute to John Cornforth. Cambridge: John Adamson, pp. 284–7, ISBN 978-0-9524322-5-8 OCLC 78044620
- Stourton, James (2012). Great Houses of London. London: Frances Lincoln. ISBN 978-0-7112-3366-9.
