= Charles de La Fosse =

French painter (1636–1716)

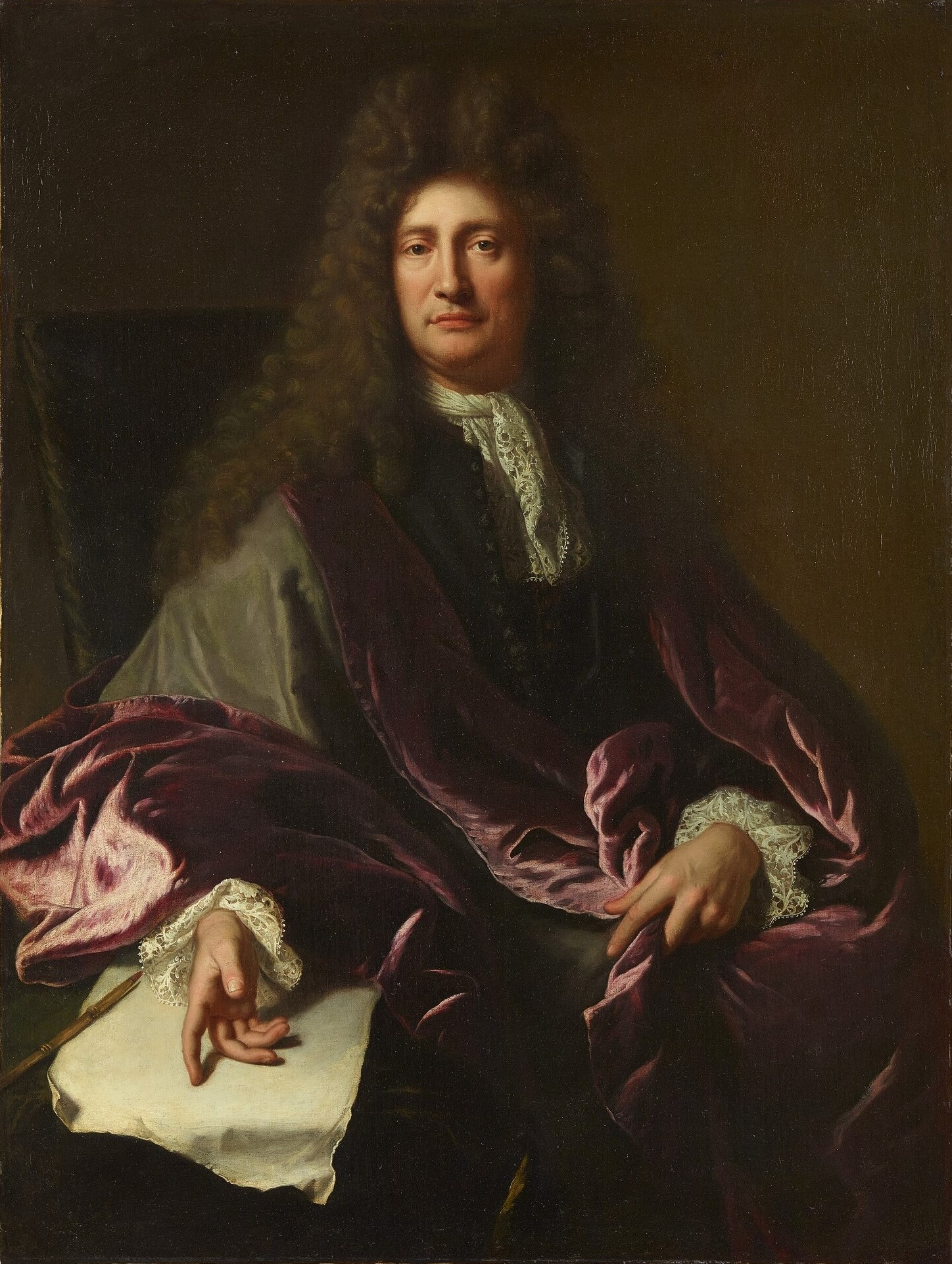
- La Fosse at the age of 52, by André Bouys (1688)
- Born: 15 June 1636; Paris, France
- Died: 13 December 1716 (aged 80); Paris, France
- Known for: Painting

Director of the Académie de Peinture et de Sculpture
- In office 1699–1702
- Monarch: Louis XIV
- Preceded by: Noël Coypel
- Succeeded by: Antoine Coysevox

Charles de La Fosse (French pronunciation: [ʃaʁl də la fos]; or Lafosse; 15 June 1636 – 13 December 1716) was a French painter born in Paris.

== Life ==
He was one of the most noted and least servile pupils of Le Brun, under whose direction he shared in the chief of the great decorative works undertaken in the reign of Louis XIV.

Leaving France in 1662, he spent two years in Rome and three in Venice. The influence of his prolonged studies of Veronese is evident in his Finding of Moses (Louvre), and in his Rape of Proserpine (Louvre), which he presented to the Royal Academy as his diploma picture in 1673. He was at once named assistant professor, and in 1674 the full responsibilities of the office devolved on him, but his engagements did not prevent his accepting in 1689 the invitation of Lord Montagu to decorate Montagu House, situated in Bloomsbury.

He visited London twice, remaining on the second occasion—together with Jacques Rousseau and Jean-Baptiste Monnoyer more than two years. William III vainly strove to detain him in England by the proposal that he should decorate Hampton Court, for Le Brun was dead, but Jules Mansart pressed La Fosse to return to Paris to take in hand the cupola of Les Invalides.

The decorations of Montagu House are destroyed, those of Versailles are restored (though his The Finding of Moses survives in the Louvre), and the dome of the Invalides (engraved by Picart and Cochin) is now the only work existing which gives a full measure of his talent. During his latter years La Fosse executed many other important decorations in public buildings and private houses, notably in that of Pierre Crozat, under whose roof he died on 13 December 1716. La Fosse was later Director of the Académie royale de peinture et de sculpture from 1699 to 1702.

The artist's works and conception played a key role in the French art history from shifting the classicism of the French style from the court of Louis XIV towards the lighter and more playful Rococo period's style. La Fosse's style prior to his emergence from the shadow of Le Brun remains a mystery, with very few sheets by him dating earlier than 1680.

== Gallery ==
Works by Charles de La Fosse

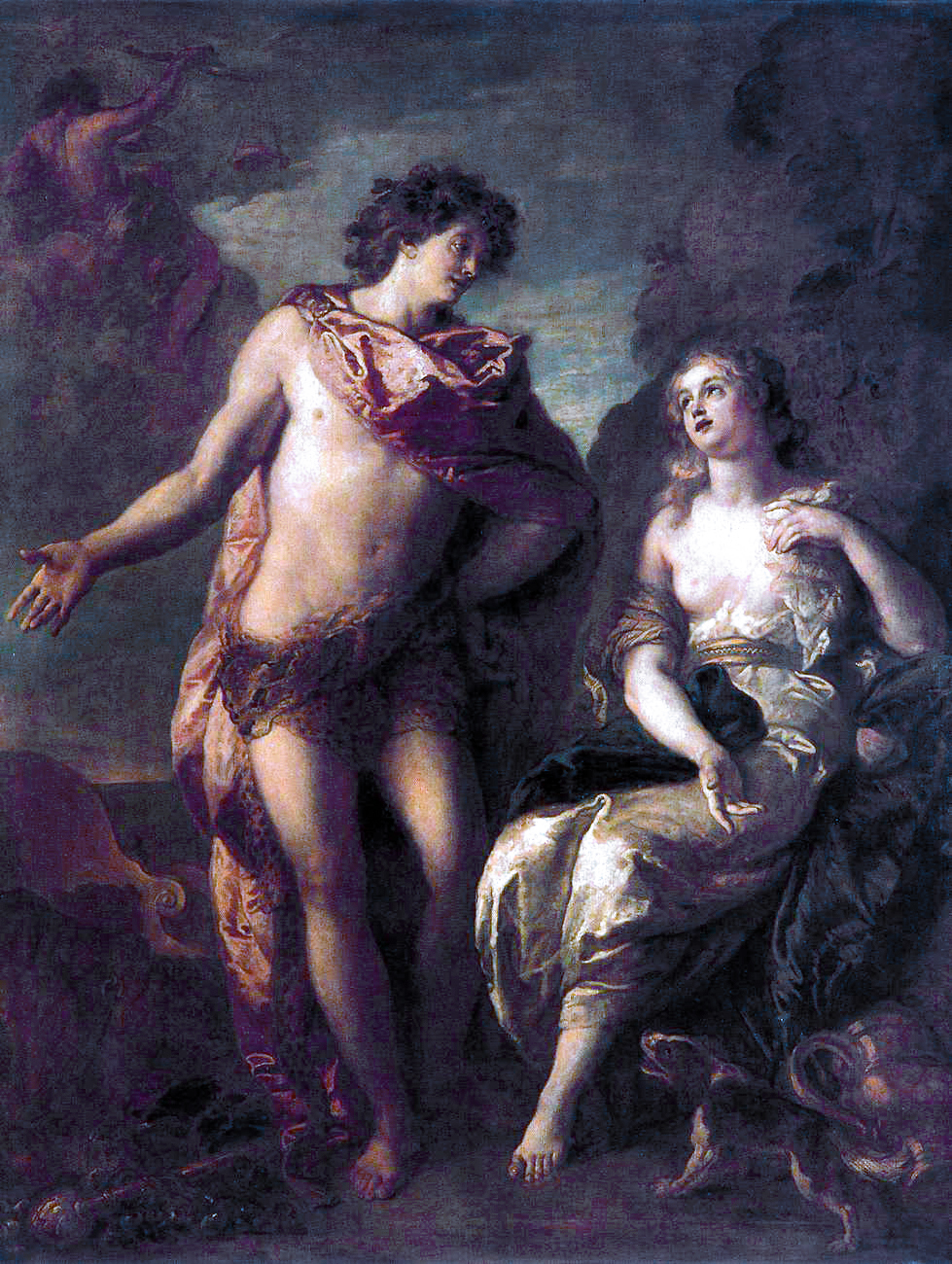
Bacchus and Ariadne (ca. 1699; Musée des Beaux-Arts de Dijon)

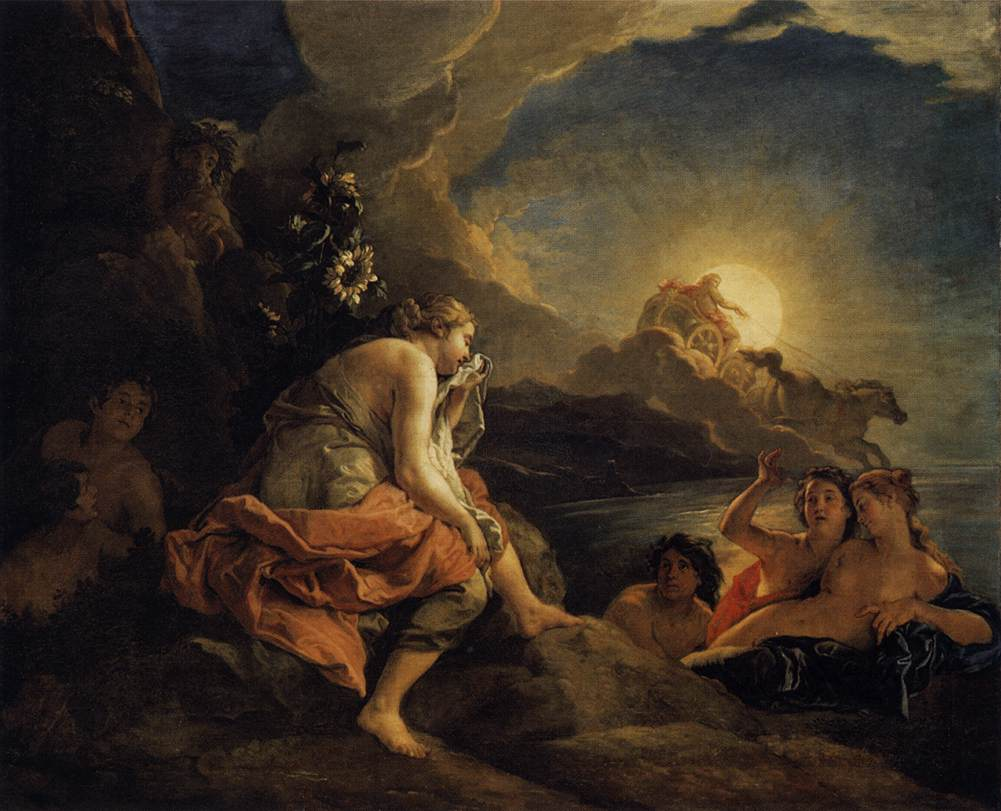
Clytia changed into a sunflower (1688; Grand Trianon, Palace of Versailles)

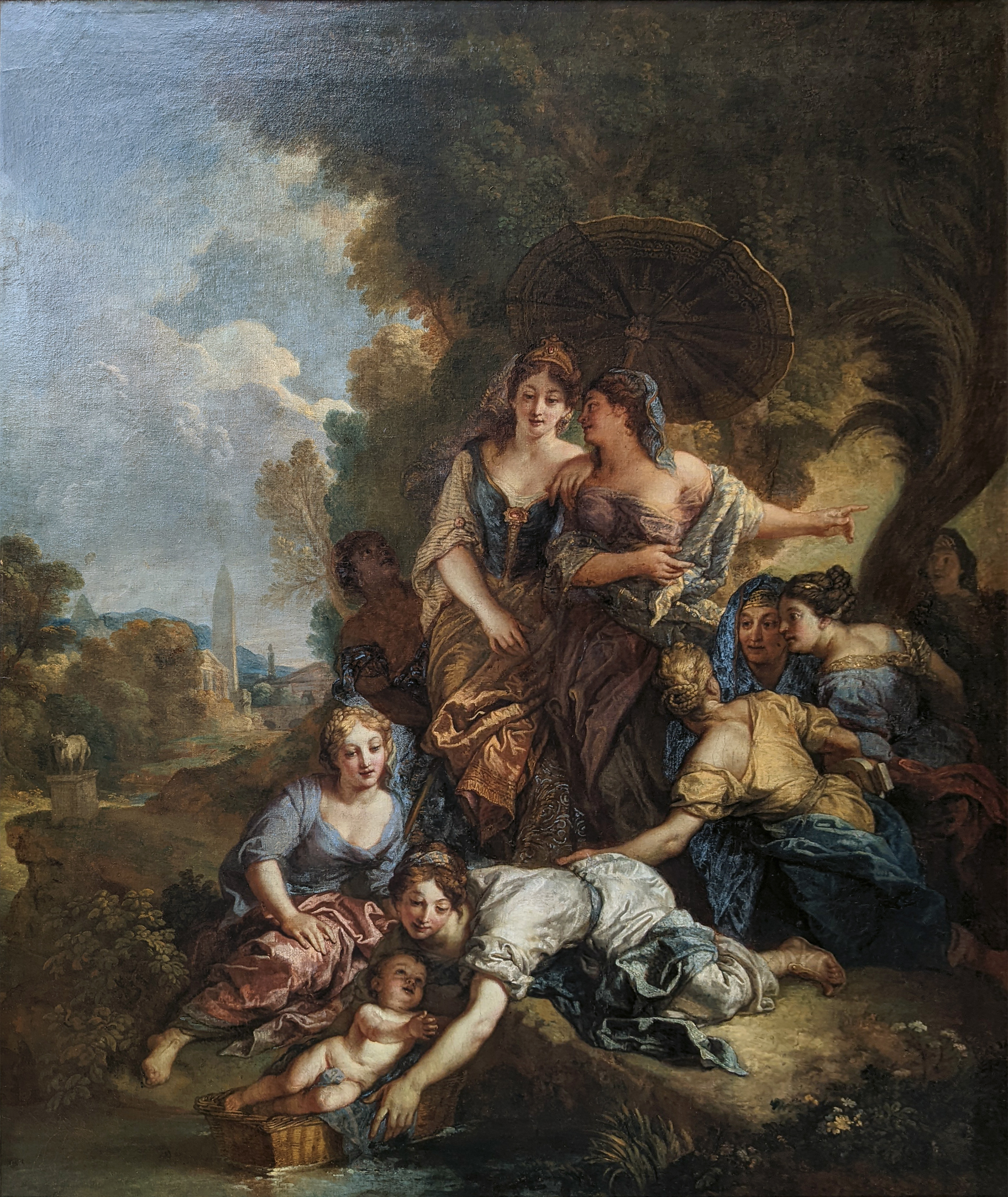
The Finding of Moses (1701; Louvre)

== See also ==
- Academic art
