= Field of the Forty Footsteps =

Coordinates: 51°31′10″N 0°7′37″W

The Field of the Forty Footsteps was part of meadow lands at the back of the British Museum, once known as the Long Fields, then Southampton Fields. As the land lay behind Montague House, the town house of Ralph Montagu, 1st Duke of Montagu, completed in 1679, it became known as Montague Fields, which contained the Field of the Forty Footsteps.

== History ==
In the last quarter of the 17th century and first half of the 18th century, Montague Fields were frequented by duellists. An area bore the print of forty irregular footsteps, which gave it its name. The traditional story was that two brothers, in the Duke of Monmouth's rebellion, took different sides and engaged each other in fight. Both were killed, and forty impressions of their feet remained on the field for many years, where no grass would grow. The encounter took place at the extreme north-east of Upper Montague Street. Another version of this story is that the two brothers were fighting for the hand of a lady, who sat on a bank and watched them as they duelled to the death. During the 18th century the site became an attraction for visitors.

In the late 18th century the poet Robert Southey went in search of the "Brothers' Steps" and found them about five hundred yards east of Tottenham Court Road. But by this time the forty had become seventy-six, according to his count, which he attributed to God's displeasure at the "horrid sin of duelling".

The final written account of the steps was given by the writer Joseph Moser: "June 16. 1800.--Went into the fields at the back of Montague House, and there saw, for the last time, the forty footsteps; the building materials are there ready to cover them from the sight of man. I counted more than forty, but they might be the foot-prints of the workmen."

== Literature ==
Several novels and plays based on the story surrounding the forty footsteps in question have been written, among them the following:

- Jane Porter and Anna Maria Porter, The Field of Forty Footsteps (1828), a romance in 3 volumes
- Messrs. Mayhew, The Field of the Forty Footsteps, a melodrama (1830)
- Percy Farren, The Field of the Forty Footsteps, a melodrama (1850)
- Geoffrey Trease, The Field of the Forty Footsteps (Macmillan) (1977), children's historical novel
- Phyllis Hastings, Field of the Forty Footsteps, New York: St. Martin's Press, 1979

== See also ==
- Montagu House, Bloomsbury
