= Jacques Rousseau (painter) =

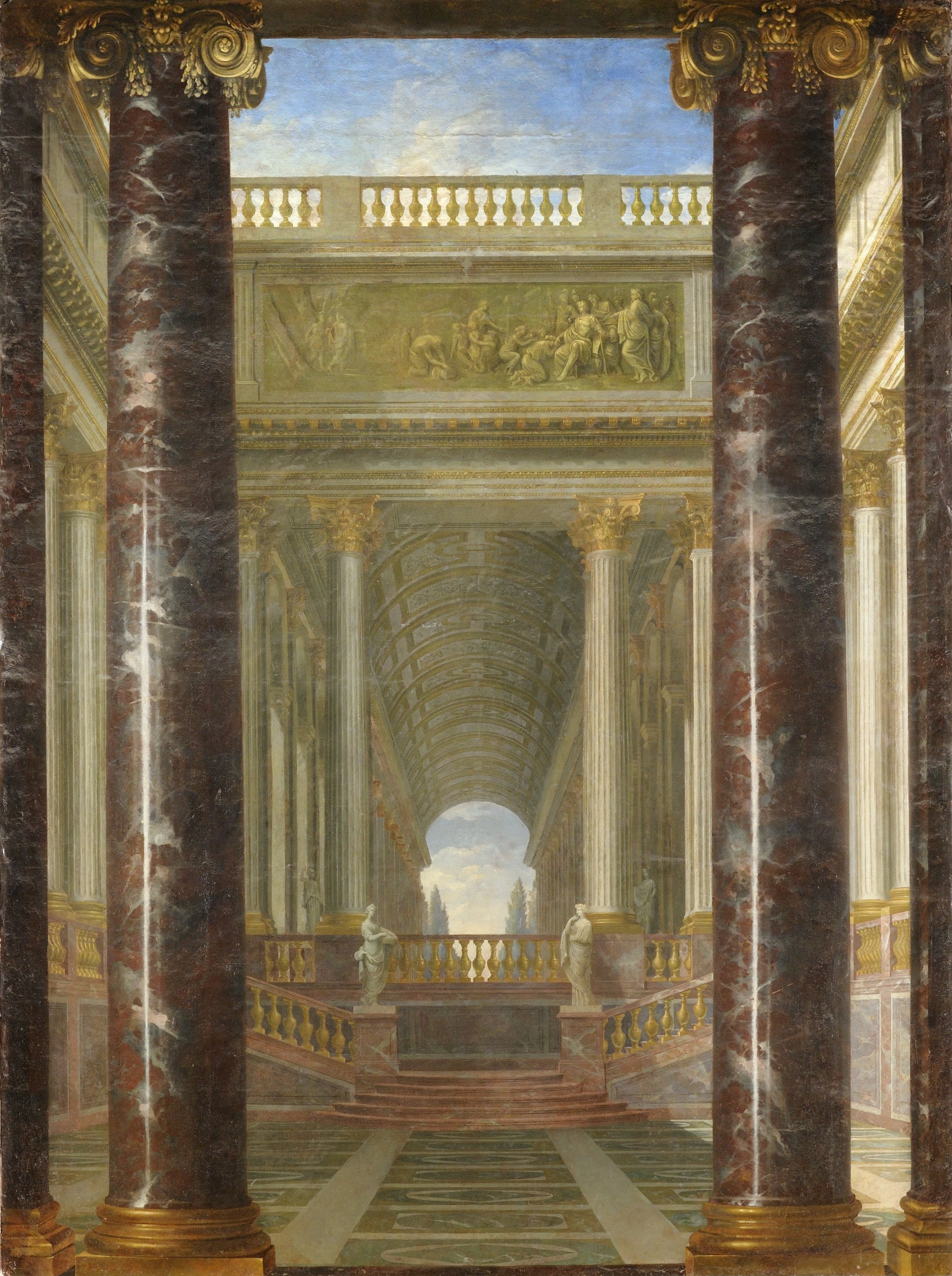
Trompe-l'œil by Jacques Rousseau in the Palace of Versailles

Jacques Rousseau (4 June 1630 – 16 December 1693) was a French painter.

== Biography ==
A member of a Huguenot family, Rousseau was born at Paris.

He was noted as a painter of trompe-l'œil, decorative landscapes and classic ruins, somewhat in the style of Canaletto, but without his delicacy of touch; he appears also to have been influenced by Nicolas Poussin and Gaspard Dughet.

While young Rousseau went to Rome, where he spent some years in painting the ancient ruins, together with the surrounding landscapes. He thus formed his style, which was artificial and conventionally decorative. His colouring for the most part is unpleasing, partly owing to his violent treatment of skies with crude blues and orange, and his chiaroscuro usually is much exaggerated. On his return to Paris he soon became distinguished as a painter, and was employed to decorate walls at the Hôtel Lambert and for Louis XIV and Philippe d'Orleans, at the Château de Saint-Cloud, Palace of Versailles, Château de Saint-Germain-en-Laye, Château de Marly and other locations (all destroyed except two at Versailles). He was admitted a member of the Académie de Peinture et de Sculpture on 2 September 1662, but on the revocation of the edict of Nantes in 1685, he was obliged to take refuge in Switzerland and Holland, and his name was struck off the Academy roll.

In 1690 he was invited to England by the duke of Montague, who employed him, together with other French painters, to paint the walls of his palace, Montague House (on the site of which is now the British Museum). Rousseau was also employed to paint architectural subjects and landscapes in the palace of Hampton Court, where many of his decorative panels still exist. He spent the latter part of his life in London, where he died in 1693.

Examples of his work are in the British Museum, Hampton Court Palace, Windsor Castle, Boughton House (Northants) and Aston Hall (Birmingham).

Besides being a painter in oil and fresco Rousseau was an etcher of some ability; many etchings by his hand from the works of the Annibale Caracci and from his own designs still exist; they are vigorous, though coarse in execution. He was influenced by the painter Herman van Swanevelt, whose sister he married.

== Sources ==
- Nichols, Thomas (1996). "Jacques Rousseau," in Jane Turner, ed., Dictionary of Art, London: Macmillan Publ. Ltd., Vol. 27, pp. 263–264. doi:10.1093/gao/9781884446054.article.T074206.
