= Montagu House, Portman Square =

Former residential building in London, England

Coordinates: 51.5163°N 0.1577°W

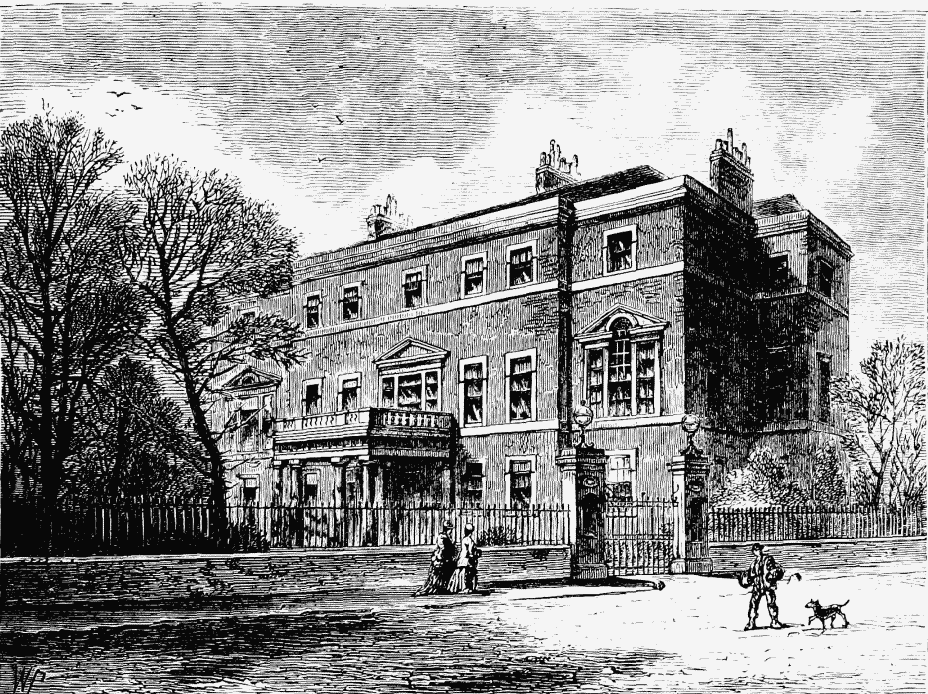
Montagu House as depicted in Old and New London (1878)

Montagu House, c.1831 (extreme top left)

Montagu House at 22 Portman Square was a historic London house. Occupying a site at the northwest corner of the square, in the angle between Gloucester Place and Upper Berkeley Street, it was built for Mrs Elizabeth Montagu, a wealthy widow and patroness of the arts, to the design of the neoclassicist architect James Stuart. Construction began in 1777 and the house was completed in 1781, whereupon it became Mrs Montagu's London residence until her death on 25 August 1800. The house was destroyed by an incendiary bomb in the Blitz of London and the site is now occupied by the Nobu Hotel Portman Square.

As described in a newspaper of the time, there were some improvements to the house that were completed in 1791. These were a drawing room and a feather room. The drawing room was designed by Bonomi. The centrepiece of the ceiling was painted by Riguad. The columns of verde antico were executed by Bartoli. The chimney piece was by Westmascott. The carvings and gildings were by Nelson and Borgnis. The drawing room was hung with white figured damask.

The curtains were white satin fringed with gold. In addition the room was furnished with chandeliers and large mirrors. The feather room was designed by Bonomi. The background on the walls was of white feathers. These were then decorated with brilliantly coloured feathers sewn together to form festoons of flowers and other fanciful decorations. The decoration of this room was executed by Mrs Montagu together with a number of other women attendants.

== See also ==
- List of demolished buildings and structures in London
- Montagu House, Bloomsbury
- Montagu House, Whitehall
- Montagu House, Blackheath
