= The Finding of Moses (La Fosse) =

Painting by Charles de la Fosse

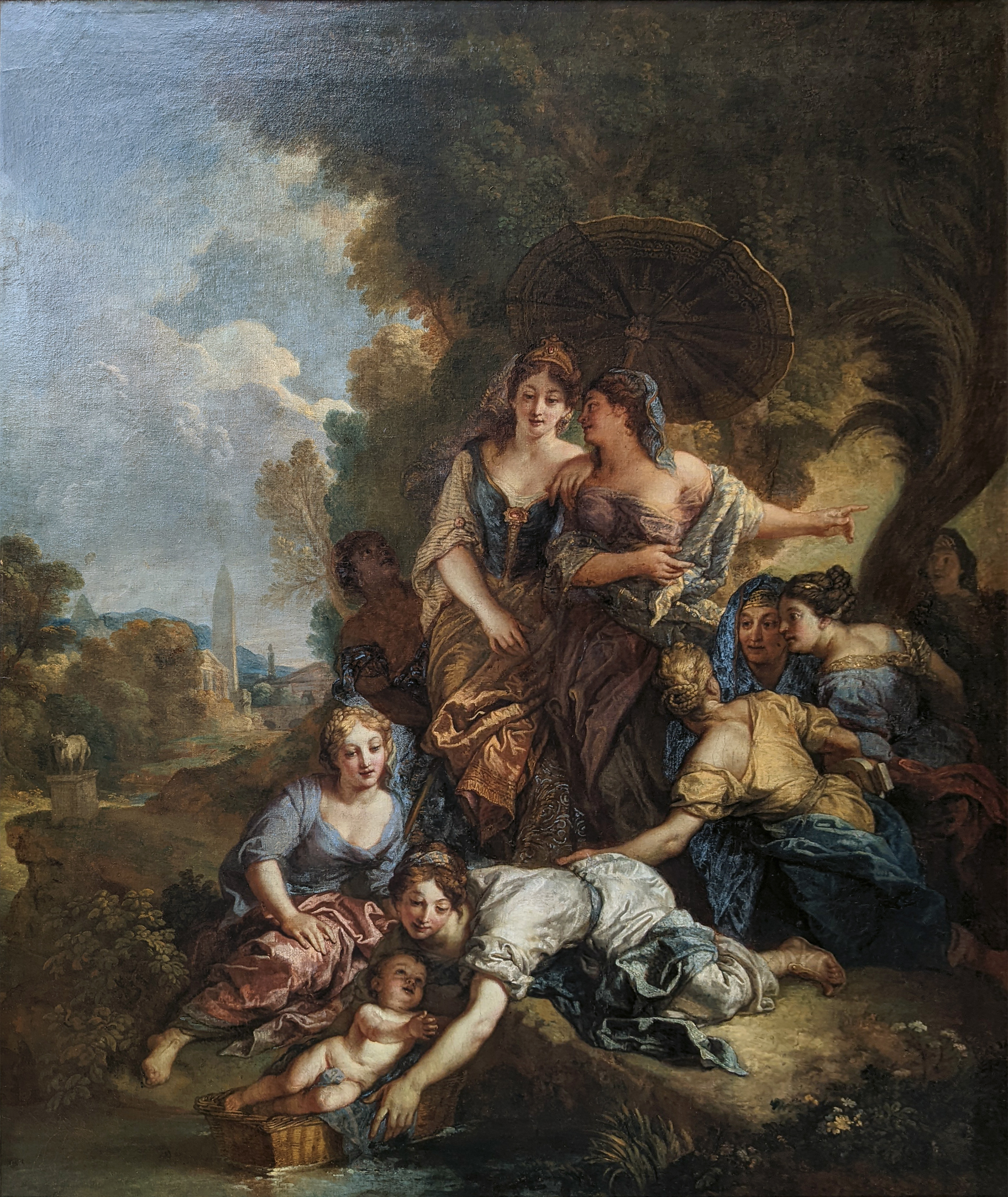

The Finding of Moses is a 1701 oil on canvas painting by Charles de La Fosse. It was commissioned for the billiards room at the Palace of Versailles and is now in room 36 of the Sully Wing of the Louvre Museum.
