= Noble Households =

Book edited by Tessa Murdoch

- Jacket showing "The General Front of Blenheim Castle", from John Woolfe and James Gandon, Vitruvius Britannicus, vol. v, 1771
- Author: Tessa Murdoch, with inventories transcribed by Candace Briggs and Laurie Lindey
- Language: English
- Release number: 1st edition
- Subject: Social history, Material culture
- Published: Cambridge
- Publisher: John Adamson
- Publication date: 21 November 2006
- Publication place: United Kingdom
- Media type: Print
- Pages: 320
- ISBN: 978-0-9524322-5-8
- OCLC: 78044620
- LC Class: NK928 .N53 2006
- Website: Book on publisher's website

Noble Households: Eighteenth-Century Inventories of Great English Houses presents transcripts of inventories of nine great country houses and four London town houses as a tribute to the late historian John Cornforth.

== Summary ==
The inventories document in astounding detail the taste and lifestyle of leading noble families and their households. John Cornforth first "put forward the idea of this publication as a primary resource for the interpretation of the historic interior". As the book's dust-wrapper states, it was his hope that it "would revitalise the study of the great house in the eighteenth century".

== Structure ==
The inventories, compiled for a variety of purposes by professional appraisers in conjunction with family members or their stewards, are supplemented with a glossary and index to the items listed. The inventories are grouped as follows:

Part I: Montagu Inventories

- Montagu House, Bloomsbury, London, 1709 and 1733
- Boughton House, Northamptonshire, 1709, 1718 and 1730
- Ditton House, Buckinghamshire, 1709
- Montagu House, Whitehall, London, 1746

Part II: The Drayton Inventories

- Drayton House, Northamptonshire, 1710 and 1724

Part III: The Ditchley Inventories

- Ditchley, Oxfordshire, 1743 and 1772

Part IV: Norfolk Inventories

- Houghton Hall, 1745 and 1792
- Holkham Hall, Norfolk, and Thanet House, London, 1760

Part V: Inventories of the Marquess of Carmarthen

- Kiveton and Thorp Salvin, Yorkshire, 1727

Part VI: The Marlborough Inventories

- Blenheim Palace, Oxfordshire, and Marlborough House, London, 1740

The end matter comprises:

- Glossary and concordance
- Further reading (John Cornforth's writings which draw on the inventories in this book)
- Credits (photographs and inventories)
- Index

== Critical reception ==
In her review in Apollo, Susan Jenkins encapsulated Cornforth's intentions when she averred that with the selection of inventories in the book, "Cornforth hoped to inspire another generation of scholars to take his work forward into the 21st century". This view was endorsed by James Miller when he wrote in the Times Literary Supplement, "It is to be hoped that more inventories will now be published as they are the bedrock of the understanding of the taste of a particular period."

Writing in the Burlington Magazine, Andrew Moore saw the book as "an important step in the wider recognition of archival studies in relation to the social and cultural history of England"; whereas John Harris writing in the Art Newspaper acknowledged the usefulness of the book's index, when he declared that it "demonstrates the value of inventories for an understanding of the furnished interior'.

Reviewing the book for Studies in the Decorative Arts, the Bard Graduate Center's journal, Simon Swynfen Jervis commented that "When inventories are reasonably comprehensive and are ordered room by room ... —and this applies to all those in Noble Households—they are difficult to surpass as documents of most aspects of interior decoration."
