= Edward Strong the Elder =

British sculptor (1652–1724)

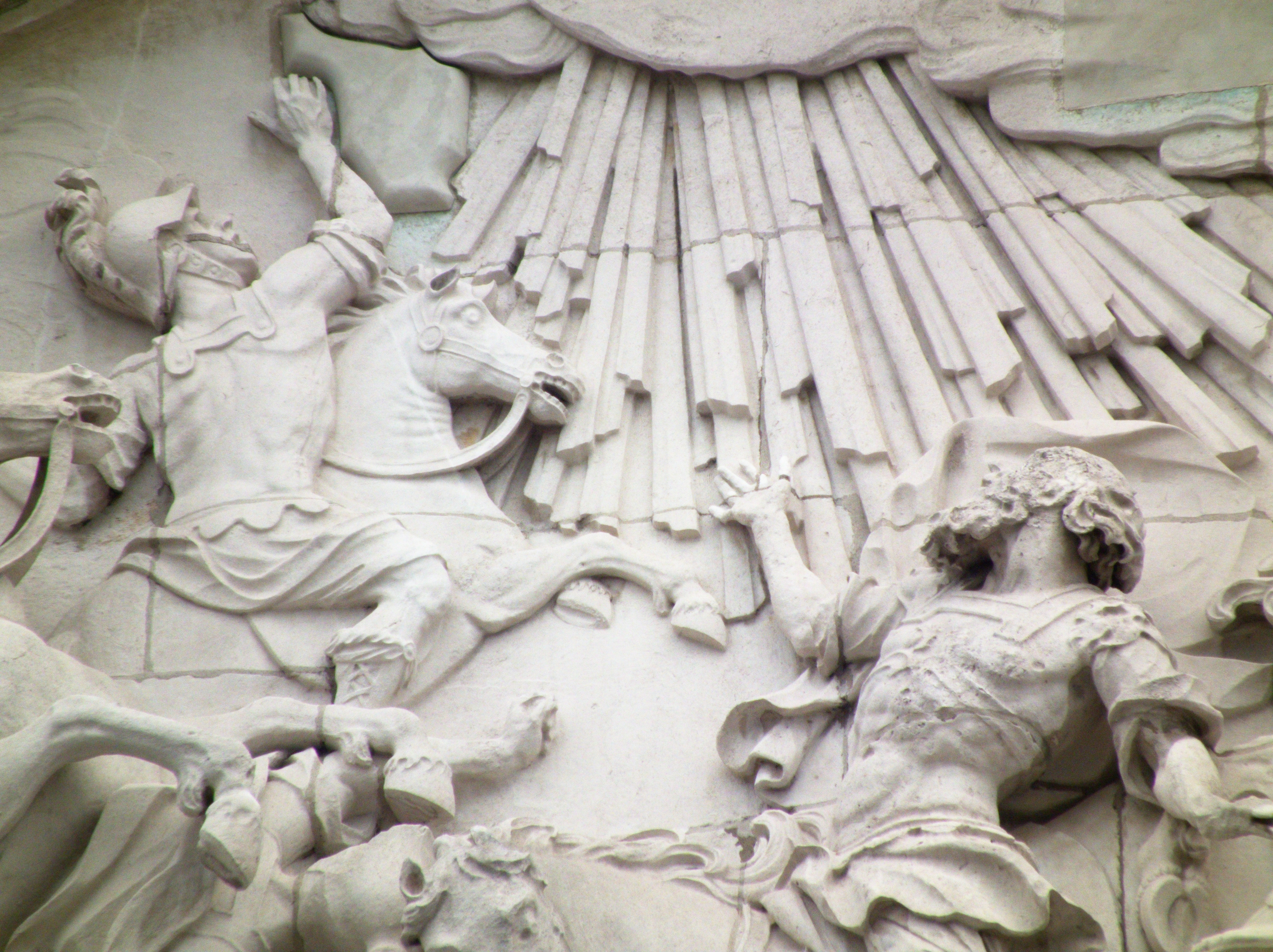
Sculptural detail on St Paul's Cathedral by Edward Strong

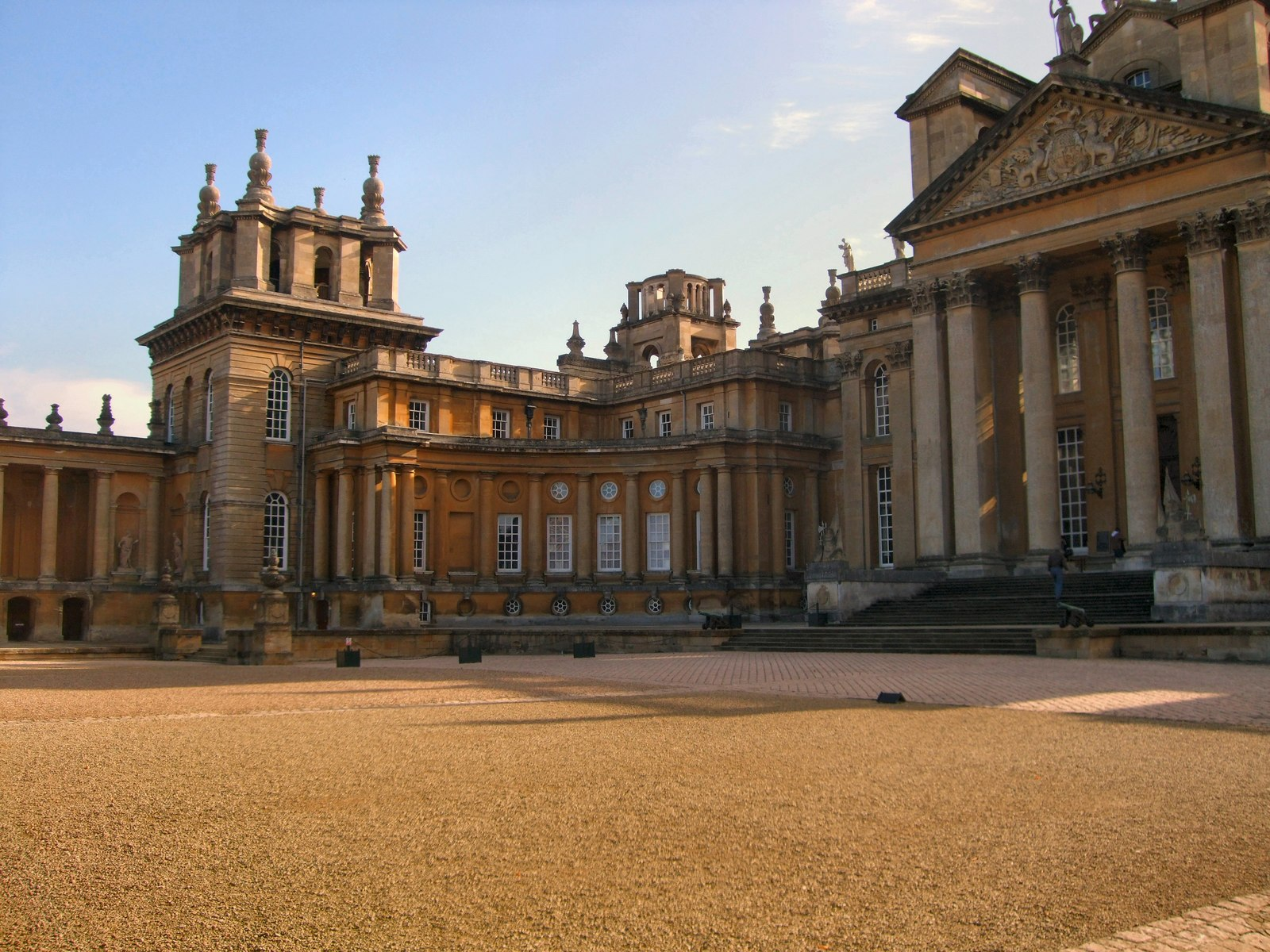
Stonework at Blenheim Palace

Edward Strong the Elder (1652–1724) was a British sculptor mainly working in London in the 17th and 18th centuries. He led a team of 65 masons and were responsible for many important projects including the rebuilding of St Paul's Cathedral and Blenheim Palace.

== Life ==
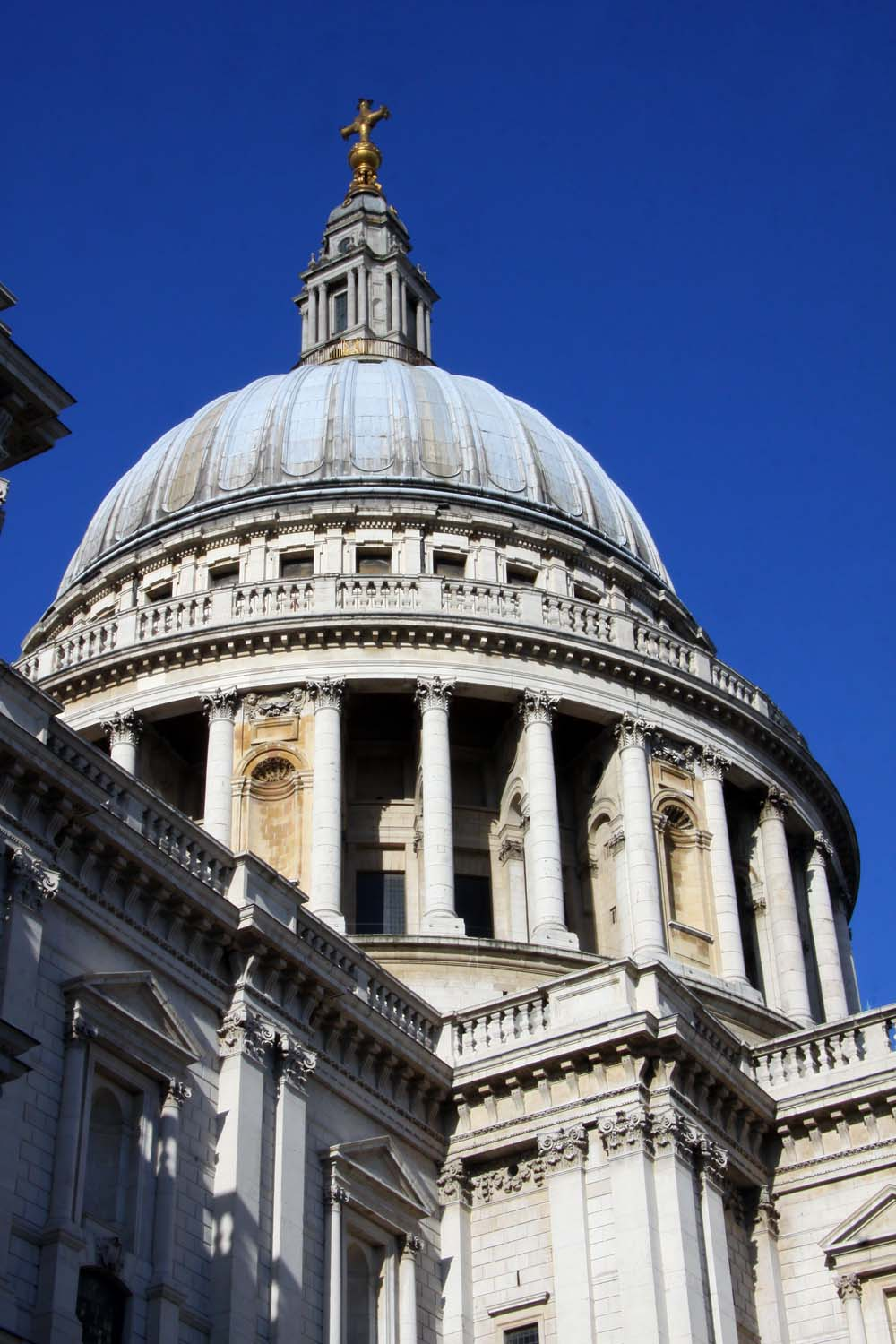
The dome of St Paul's decorated by Strong

Edward came from a long line of masons and quarry owners and was the son of Valentine Strong (1609–1662) and Anne Margetts. Valentine had built Sherborne House for Sir John Dutton 1651 to 1653. His grandfather Timothy Strong rebuilt the frontage of Cornbury House in 1631. His elder brother Thomas Strong was also a mason but died young in 1681.

In 1680 he became a full guild member of the Masons Company of London. London was still in the aftermath of the Great Fire and many major rebuilding projects were planned. Strong formed a business relationship with Christopher Wren around 1680 with their first joint project being St Benet's, Paul's Wharf one of the many churches destroyed in the fire. There most important joint project was St Paul's which is nor only the magnum opus of Wren but also of Strong. Strong oversaw the bulk of the ornamentation including the frontage and the dome.

Wren and Strong appear to have been friends over and beyond their long-standing business connection, and the relationship was certainly mutually beneficial. Their sons were particularly close (see below). It is likely that they spent much private time together discussing the practicalities and design options of various design features.

He died on 8 February 1724 and was buried in the Church of St Peter, St. Albans. His monument has a bust and is probably by this son.

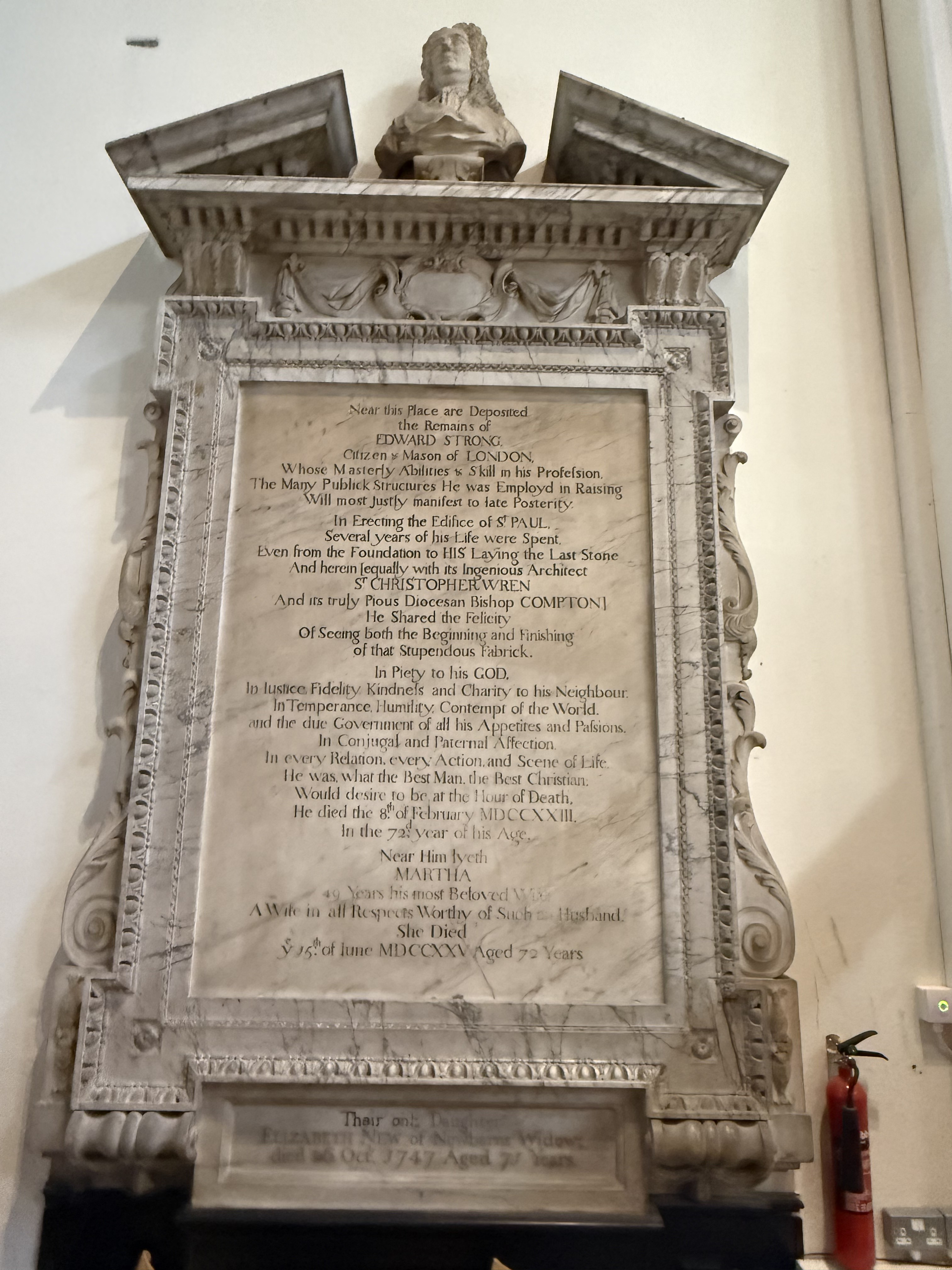
Edward Strong the Elder Memorial in St. Albans Cathedral, photographed by Igor Zeiger

=== Known works ===
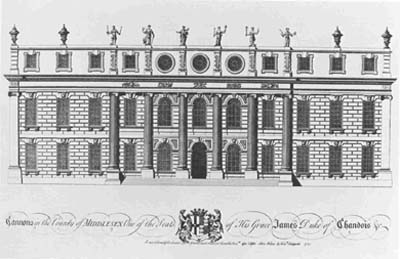
Cannons house by Strong

- St Paul's Cathedral (1680–1697)
- St. Benet's, Paul's Wharf (1680)
- St Austin-by-St. Paul's (1680)
- St. Mildred's Church (1677–1683)
- New classical frontage at Winchester Palace (1682–1686)
- St Mary Magdalen Old Fish Street (1683–1687)
- St Clement, Eastcheap (1683–1687)
- St Michael Paternoster Royal (1685–1694)
- Chimneypiece for the Queen's Withdrawing Room at the Palace of Whitehall (1688)
- Remodelling of Greenwich Palace (1698)
- Blenheim Palace (1705–1712)
- Sundial at Inner Temple Gardens (1707)
- Cannons for the Duke of Chandos (1715)

== Family ==
Edward Strong the Elder was born into a long-established family of masons originating in the Cotswolds, centred around Burford, Oxfordshire — a district famed for its fine freestone and stone-carving traditions. He was the nephew of Thomas Strong (c. 1636 – 1681), the mason who laid the foundation stone of St Paul’s Cathedral in 1675 under Sir Christopher Wren, and the brother of Thomas Strong the Younger, who also worked on major London rebuilding contracts after the Great Fire of 1666. He married Martha Beauchamp, sister of the sculptor Ephraim Beauchamp, thereby linking the Strong family with another distinguished dynasty of City craftsmen. The couple had several children; their eldest son, Edward Strong the Younger (1676 – 1741), succeeded him in the family business and became Wren’s principal mason on the upper works and lantern of St Paul’s Cathedral as well as on later royal and aristocratic commissions such as Marlborough House and Blenheim Palace.

== Artistic recognition ==
Edward the Elder was portrayed by Godfrey Kneller around 1690. The portrait is held by the Museum of Freemasonry.
