= Boughton House =

Historic country house in Northamptonshire, England

Coordinates: 52.4245°N 0.6778°W

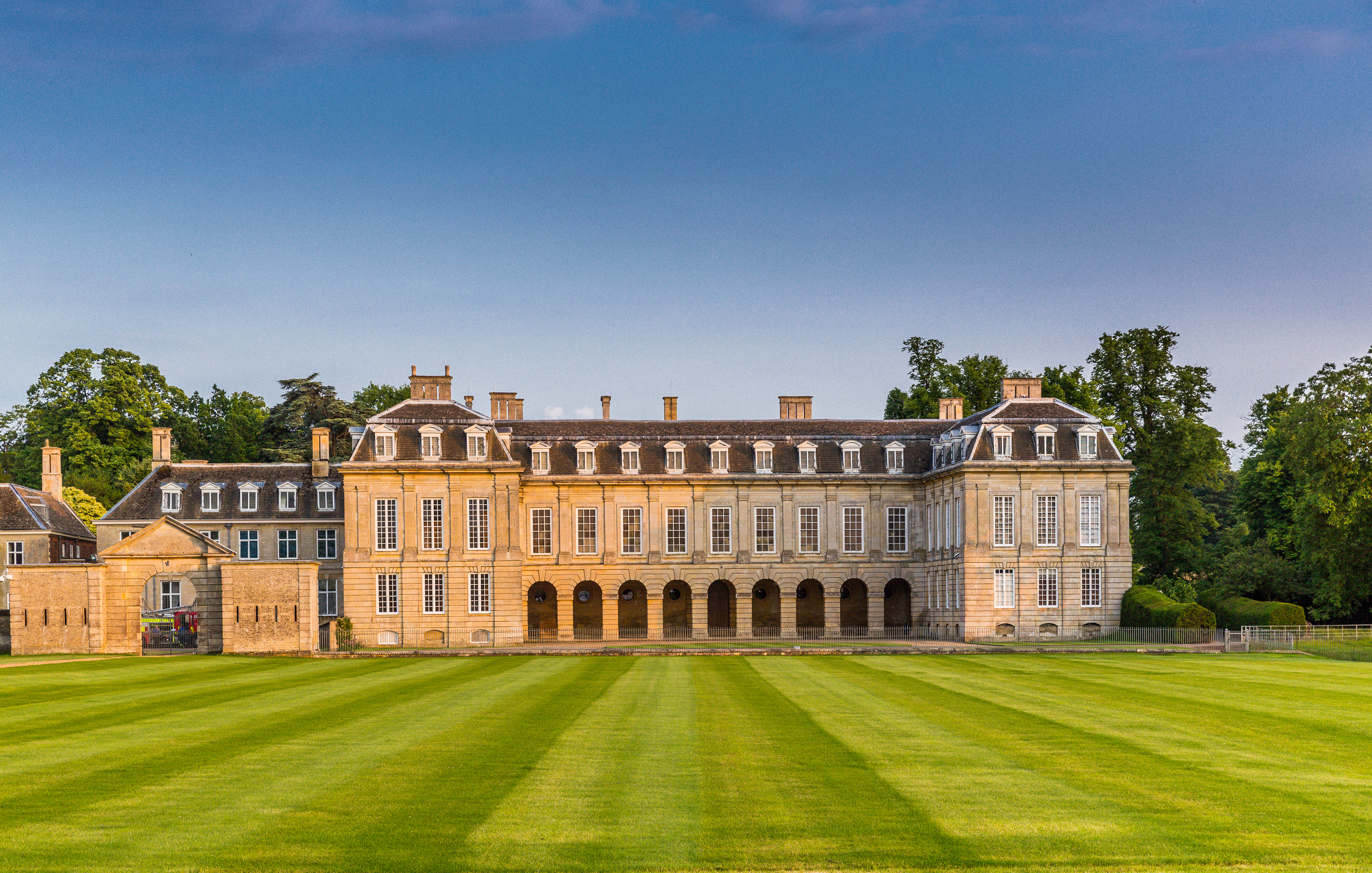
Boughton House, Northamptonshire, England

Boughton House is a country house in the parish of Weekley in Northamptonshire, England, located about 3 miles (4.8 km) north-east of Kettering. It is situated within an estate of 11,000 acres (4,451.5 ha).

The present house was built by Ralph Montagu, 1st Duke of Montagu (d.1709), immediately after 1683 when he inherited the estate from his father, whose own grandfather Sir Edward Montagu, Lord Chief Justice, had bought it in 1528. The 1st Duke had served as the Ambassador to France during the 1670s and was much influenced by contemporary French architecture and garden design, especially by the Palace of Versailles, which style he reproduced at Boughton.

It is now one of the seats of the builder's descendant Richard Montagu Douglas Scott, 10th Duke of Buccleuch and is famed for its beauty, its collections, and for having survived virtually unchanged since the 17th century. While possessing a medieval core, its exterior evokes a 17th-century French chateau, causing it to be termed The English Versailles (a moniker also applied to Petworth House in Sussex, amongst others).

The magnificence of the collections at Boughton is explained by the ducal family surname Montagu-Douglas-Scott, which reflects the union of three great families and their estates through marriage: Montagu, the Dukes of Montagu; Douglas, the Dukes of Queensberry; and Scott, the Dukes of Buccleuch.

Boughton contains a comprehensive collection of furniture, tapestries, porcelain and carpets. The art collection includes many notable paintings such as The Adoration of the Shepherds by El Greco, Thomas Gainsborough’s portrait of Mary Montagu, a celebrated series of grisailles by Van Dyck, and Breaking Cover by John Wootton.

Once a servants' hall, located next to the kitchen, the armoury is now home to what many experts regard as one of the finest privately held armouries in the country. It is an historic collection that owes much to John, 2nd Duke of Montagu (1690–1749).

Boughton House is a venue for events, weddings, corporate activities and organised groups. The House is open on certain days each year for guided tours and is a member of Historic Houses.

== History ==
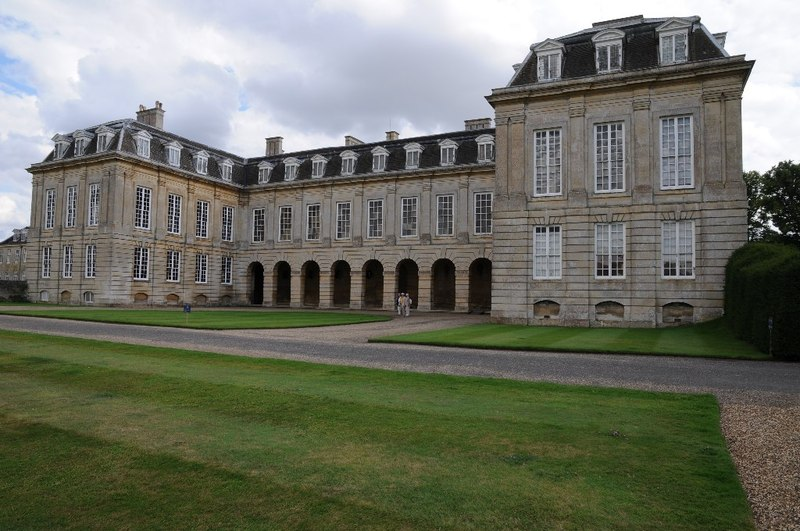
Boughton House

The original house was a monastic building but Sir Edward Montagu, Lord Chief Justice to King Henry VIII, purchased it in 1528 just prior to the Dissolution of the Monasteries and began to convert it into a mansion. Most of the present building is the work of Ralph Montagu, 1st Duke of Montagu (d.1709) who inherited the house in 1683.

Ralph Montagu, 1st Duke of Montagu, was a patron of many Huguenot craftsmen. The Huguenot movement played an important role in his creation of The English Versailles.

Montagu was an English ambassador to France, and Boughton House shows strong French architectural influences. His son, John Montagu, 2nd Duke of Montagu, made little alteration to the house, but made sweeping changes to the landscape and gardens after his return from campaign in Europe with his father-in-law, John Churchill, 1st Duke of Marlborough.

Following the death of George, 3rd Duke of Montagu, in 1790, the house passed, through the marriage of his daughter, Elizabeth, to Henry Scott, 3rd Duke of Buccleuch, 5th Duke of Queensberry. From the mid-18th century, Boughton House was little used or altered, but was well cared for. As a result of this it has some of the best preserved baroque state rooms in the British Isles. According to Robert Edmonds, land steward at Boughton House in 1797, "In the year 1792 Boughton gardens were thrown open to the park and the deer and other stock were admitted. A considerable improvement has been made in them by means of the mud which was taken out of the ponds."

In the late 20th century, Boughton became the dower house of Mary ("Mollie"), Duchess of Buccleuch, widow of the 8th Duke, who brought it back to life. The noted diarist Chips Channon, who was a guest in 1945, wrote: "It is a dream house with a strange, sleepy quality, but its richness, its beauty and possessions are stupefying. Everything belonged to Charles I, or Marie de Medici, or was given by Louis XIV to the Duke of Monmouth... There are 72 miles of drives in the park... The long view from the terrace here is like a Claude Lorrain... But it is the stillness, the curious quiet of Boughton that impresses the most."

Following the death of Dowager Duchess Mollie in 1993, the 9th Duke opened Boughton to small tours through arts organisations and the house is now open to the public for guided tours for a few weeks each year.

== Garden ==
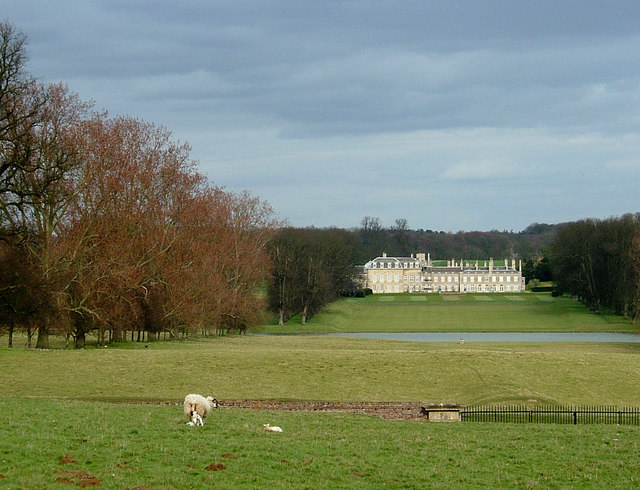
Boughton House, from afar

In keeping with the French style of its exterior, Boughton House is set amidst a highly impressive formal, yet arcadian garden of strict geometry, designed on the golden ratio. Vast swathes of turf, planes of reflecting water, strong lines of trees and linear earth forms create an intellectually meditative landscape indicative of the Age of Enlightenment and the idea that a garden could be a journey of the mind, yet acknowledge the natural world. The 2nd Duke, who had been nicknamed John The Planter, swept away the previous ornamental parterres, multiplied the avenues of elms and planes, and developed the role of water which structures the garden. Later, the landscaper of the garden at Stowe, Charles Bridgeman, who was under his employ, is believed to have created the sculptural earth forms.

Restoration of the garden was begun by the 9th Duke, and has continued under the 10th Duke. It included returning the River Ise to its 18th-century width, which required two miles of green oak boarding, fixed by coach bolts. In 2009, landscape designer Kim Wilkie was commissioned to create a new work to complement an existing pyramidal grassed mount. The result, called Orpheus, is named after the famed musician of Greek mythology who, when his wife Eurydice died, went down into the underworld to try to reclaim her. His music was so beautiful that Hades relented and allowed Eurydice to return to the world of the living. This striking landform seamlessly continues the garden's intellectual dialogue via an immense inverted pyramid and spiral rill, both set within a golden ratio. In 2015, The Grand Étang, or 'large lake' in French, a long-vanished lake of almost 1-acre (0.40 ha) with a 75-foot (23 m) tall water jet was recreated, to reflect once again the main frontage of Boughton. Located immediately to the north-west of the house, it is one of the earliest surviving features from the original gardens and designed landscape. It was created in the early 18th century as a reflecting pool for the house and was also used for ice-skating in the winter.

== Recent events ==
In 2012, unknown scores of Italian Baroque music, including by Vivaldi, were discovered in the Montagu Music Collection at Boughton. From 2014, Boughton has been the venue for the Greenbelt festival, a festival of arts, faith and justice held annually in England since 1974. Boughton has featured as a filming location, including; Les Misérables (2012) and An American Aristocrat's Guide to Great Estates (2020). In 2022, Boughton was a location for the Ridley Scott film Napoleon (2023).

== See also ==
- Montagu House – the 1st Duke of Montagu's London house, and later the first home of the British Museum
- Drumlanrig Castle – also owned by the Duke of Buccleuch
- Dalkeith Palace – also owned by the Duke of Buccleuch
- Bowhill House – also owned by the Duke of Buccleuch
- Treasure Houses of Britain – 1985 documentary TV series partly filmed at Boughton
- Noble Households – 2006 book with Boughton House inventories from 1709, 1718, 1730

== Bibliography ==
- Cornforth, John, "Boughton: Impressions and People", in T. Murdoch, Boughton House: The English Versailles, pp. 12–31
- Cornforth, John, Early Georgian Interiors. New Haven, Conn.; London: Yale University Press for the Paul Mellon Centre for Studies in British Art, 2004, pp. 119–20 ISBN 978-0-30-010330-4 OCLC 938151474
- Murdoch, Tessa (ed.), Boughton House: The English Versailles. London: Faber & Faber/Christie's, 1992 ISBN 978-0-571-16338-0 OCLC 471803473
- Murdoch, Tessa (ed.), Noble Households: Eighteenth-Century Inventories of Great English Houses. A Tribute to John Cornforth. Cambridge: John Adamson, 2006, pp. 49–77 (featuring transcripts of Boughton House inventories dated 1709, 1718 and 1730) ISBN 978-0-9524322-5-8 OCLC 78044620
