= Edward Strong the Younger =

English master mason and architect-builder

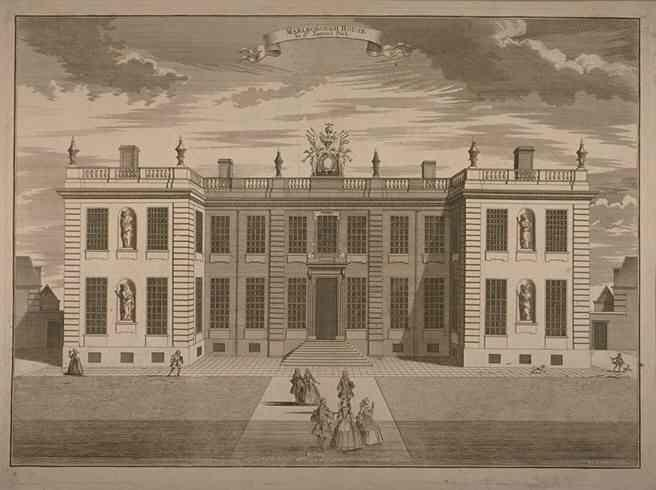
Marlborough House in its original two storey form by Edward Strong the Younger

Edward Strong the Younger (1676–1741) was an English master mason and architect-builder active in the late 17th and early 18th centuries. He is best known for his work with Sir Christopher Wren and later with Wren’s circle on major works of English Baroque, including St Paul’s Cathedral, Marlborough House, parts of Greenwich Hospital/Palace, and multiple new London parish churches of the post–Great Fire rebuilding programme. He and his father, Edward Strong the Elder (1652–1724), led one of the most important stonemasonry and building enterprises in England at the turn of the 18th century.

== Biography ==
=== Early life and training ===
Strong was the eldest son of Edward Strong the Elder, master mason of London, and Martha Beauchamp (sister of the sculptor Ephraim Beauchamp). He was born in 1676, into a dynasty of Cotswold- and London-based masons supplying high-quality freestone for elite building work. He was apprenticed to his father and entered the Masons’ Company (the London livery company that regulated the trade) in July 1691. He became “free” (i.e. a full member) on 18 October 1698. He later served the Company as Warden in 1712 and 1715, and as Master in 1718, marking him as one of the most prominent operative masons in London at the time. In 1698, immediately after gaining his freedom, Strong undertook what was effectively an early “Grand Tour”: he travelled for about a year through France, the Low Countries, and Italy together with Christopher Wren the Younger (son of Sir Christopher Wren). The trip was both technical and cultural — studying continental architecture, urbanism, and ornament at first hand — and it also shows the unusually close personal link between the Strong and Wren families. This kind of extended architectural study abroad was unusual that early (it would only become fashionable for British gentry a few decades later), and it helped position Strong the Younger not just as a contractor but as a designer-builder with European literacy in style.

=== Professional role ===
Strong the Younger worked in a period when the lines between “architect,” “master mason,” “contractor,” and “site architect” were fluid. He was often described as “mason,” “master mason,” or “mason-contractor,” but his responsibilities went well beyond stonecutting:

- supervising teams (the Strongs’ yard could employ 60+ masons simultaneously);
- procuring and shaping high-quality freestone (often Portland stone);
- translating drawings into buildable geometry, especially in complex curved or vaulted work;
- executing — and sometimes designing — towers, spires, lanterns, and other highly visible skyline elements.

Through this role he effectively acted as what we would now call a combination of site architect, construction manager, and specialist contractor for stone structure and ornament.

=== Association with Sir Christopher Wren ===
The Strong family had an extraordinary multi-decade partnership with Sir Christopher Wren, beginning with Strong’s uncle Thomas Strong and father Edward Strong the Elder in the aftermath of the Great Fire of London (1666). Wren relied on them for precision stonework and for real-world solutions to ambitious geometry — domes, drums, towers, and spires. Edward Strong the Younger inherited and extended this relationship. He worked with Wren and Wren’s office on:

==== St Paul’s Cathedral, London (1675–1710; topping-out 1708) ====
Strong took a leading role in the upper works of the dome, in particular the great stone lantern that crowns the cathedral. He is specifically recorded as “mason of the lantern.” On 26 October 1708 (the cathedral’s dome having reached its final height), the ceremonial “last stone” of the lantern was laid jointly by Christopher Wren the Younger and Edward Strong (the sources often identify this Strong as the master mason on the job). This moment symbolically echoed the laying of the cathedral’s foundation stone in June 1675, which tradition ascribes to Strong’s uncle Thomas Strong. Strong’s work at St Paul’s included highly technical curved stonework for the lantern and skyline elements — among the most structurally and visually critical parts of the building.

==== City Churches (“Wren churches”) ====
He is associated with the construction and/or completion of a number of Wren’s post-Fire churches and their later steeples / spires, where complex Baroque towers were often added a decade or two after the main nave was finished. Examples include St Vedast alias Foster, St Stephen Walbrook, St James Garlickhythe and others (see Works below).

==== Greenwich (the riverside royal hospital / palace complex at Greenwich) ====
Strong was involved in ashlar work and colonnades at Greenwich in the early 18th century, a prestigious state commission. The Strongs’ long partnership with Wren shows how English Baroque classicism (monumental porticoes, giant orders, crisp Portland stone) depended not only on a single “architect-genius,” but on a technically sophisticated mason-builder capable of realising it at scale.

=== Personal life ===
In 1699, Edward Strong the Younger married Susanna Roberts, daughter of Joseph Roberts, a prominent City “serjeant plumber.” Their marriage further tied the Strongs into London’s specialist building trades (plumbing at the time handled roofing, leadwork, cisterns, gutters, etc., which were vital to large masonry structures). The couple had at least four daughters and a son. The son, also named Edward, died of smallpox at about age 20. Their eldest daughter, Susannah Strong, later married Sir John Strange, who became Master of the Rolls (a senior judicial post), and they had eleven children, including the diplomat and collector John Strange. These marriages show that by the early 18th century Strong’s family had moved from purely craft status toward the professional–gentry world (legal office, public service, polite society).

He died on 10 October 1741.

=== Known works ===
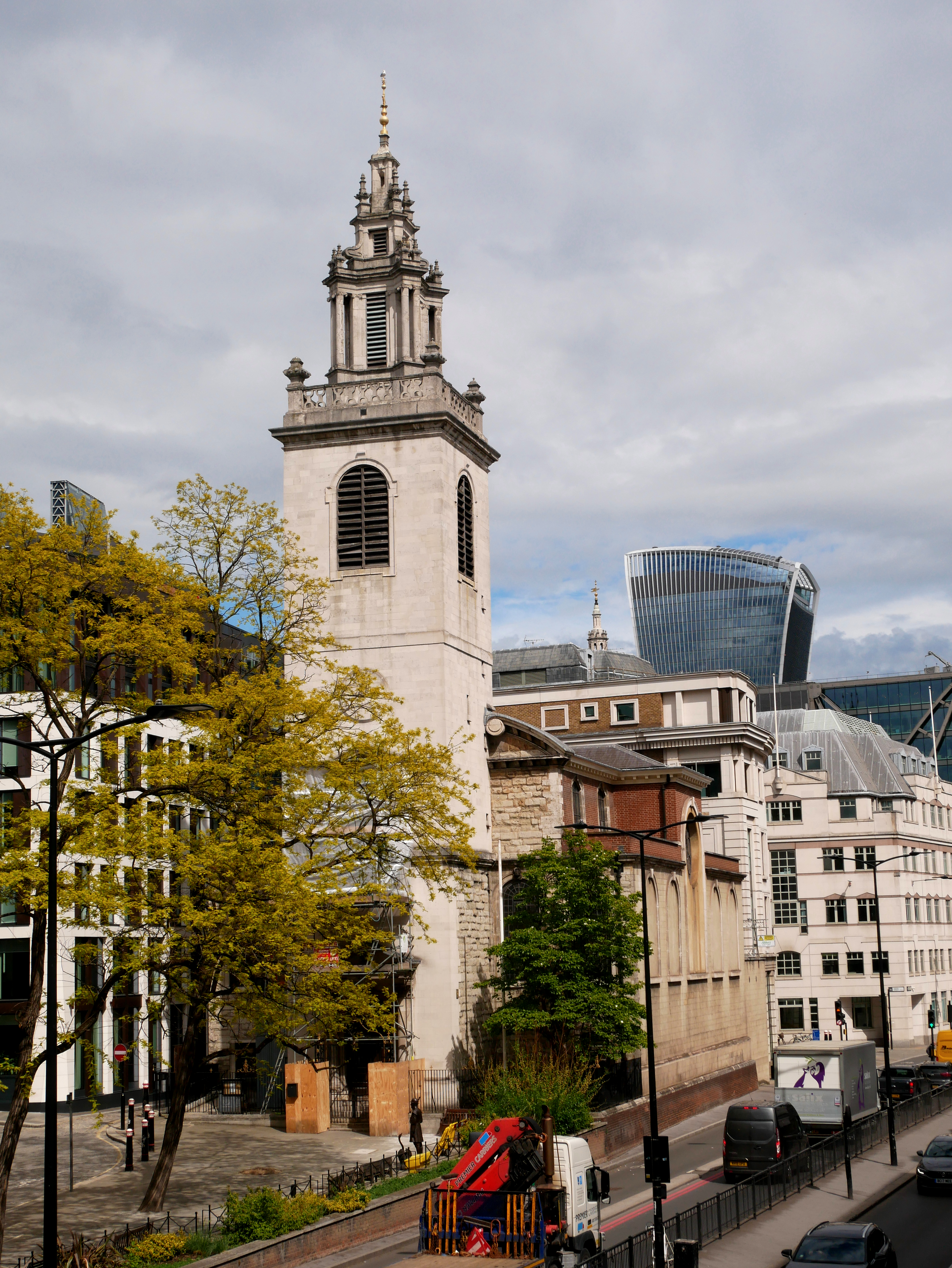
The spire of St James, Garlickhithe

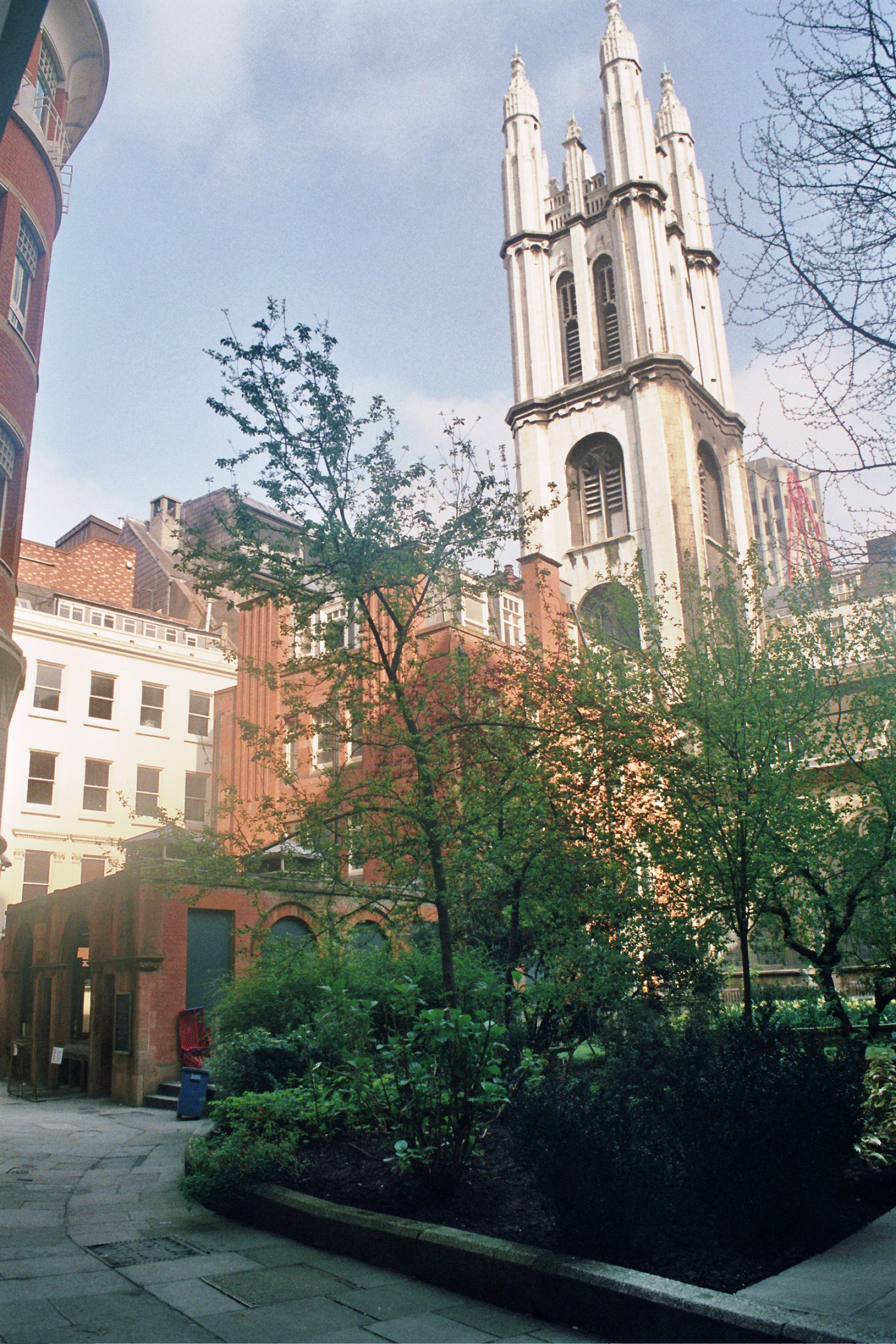
The tower of St Michael's Cornhill

- Spire on St Vedast Foster Lane (1695–1698)
- Spire on St Stephen Walbrook (c.1696)
- Lantern on St Paul's Cathedral (1706)
- Marlborough House (1708–1711)
- Chapter House, St Paul's Cathedral (1712)
- St Alphege Greenwich (1712–1714)
- St Anne Limehouse (1712–1724)
- St Paul Deptford (1712–1730)
- St. John's, Westminster (1714–1728)
- Spire on St James Garlickhithe (1715–1717)
- St George Wapping (1715–1723)
- West colonnade of Greenwich Palace (1719)
- Tower of St Michael Cornhill (1715–1721)
- Tower of St Christopher Threadneedle Street (c.1720)
- Lantern on Christ Church Greyfriars (c.1720)
- Dr Draper's house in Surrey
