= John Cornforth (historian) =

British architectural historian

- Born: 2 October 1937; Etchinghill, Staffordshire, England
- Died: 5 May 2004 (aged 66); London, England
- Education: Repton School; Corpus Christi College, Cambridge
- Occupation: Architectural historian

John Lewley Cornforth CBE (2 September 1937 – 5 May 2004) was a British architectural historian with a particular interest in the history of English country houses. He was the author of many books and articles, and architectural editor of Country Life from 1967 to 1977.

== Early life ==
Cornforth was born in 1937 at Etchinghill, Staffordshire, and was raised at Haywood Abbey, an only child of parents with private means. His childhood friends included Patrick Anson, later 5th Earl of Lichfield, at nearby Shugborough Hall. He took no interest in country pursuits – riding or shooting, cricket or golf – but enjoyed looking at Country Life from before he could read.

He was educated at Repton School and then studied history at Corpus Christi College, Cambridge, where he was influenced by art historian Michael Jaffé.

== Career ==
After university, Cornforth worked as a volunteer in the British Museum in London, and started to write articles for Country Life, joining the staff at the magazine in 1961. Its architectural editor Christopher Hussey, encouraged Cornforth to write a book with architect Oliver Hill on 17th-century country houses, published in 1966 as English Country Houses: Caroline, 1625–1685 . Cornforth followed Hussey's successor Mark Girouard as architectural editor at Country Life in 1967. He stepped down in 1977 to concentrate on his book writing, and was succeeded by Marcus Binney. He retired from Country Life in 1993 but continued to write books and articles. He wrote for Country Life for over 40 years, with a bibliography extending to over 50 pages.

The classic houses of the 17th and 18th centuries were his passion: he had little interest in Victorian houses, and disliked the 1930s Surrealist reinterpretation of Edwin Lutyens's Monkton House in Sussex for Edward James, by Kit Nicholson and Hugh Casson, with the help of Salvador Dalí.

Cornforth joined the Historic Buildings Committee of the National Trust in 1965. At a time when country houses were under substantial threat, Cornforth was involved in vetting the many houses that were offered to the National Trust. He became a member of the Historic Buildings Council for England in 1971. He was influential figure behind the scenes, on practical measures and taxation. He also wrote Country Houses in Britain, Can They Survive? in 1974, the same year as the Destruction of the Country House exhibition at the V&A.

He also took an interest in interior decoration of the houses under the care of the National Trust, and was influenced by the interior decorator John Fowler, of Colefax and Fowler. Cornforth and Fowler wrote English Decoration in the 18th Century, published in 1974. Cornforth was also involved in the creation of new British galleries at the Victoria and Albert Museum.

Noble Households edited by Tessa Murdoch

From 1968 until 2001 he served as a trustee of the Marc Fitch Fund and was its chairman for many years. This charity is concerned with funding research and publication in English local history, archaeology and related subjects. When in 2001 the Fund's council members proposed a fitting tribute on his retirement, Cornforth put forward the idea of a book of inventories to provide a primary resource for "the interpretation of the historic interior". The book was in preparation at the time of his death and what was to be a tribute became also a memorial to his life's work. As the book's dust-wrapper states: "John Cornforth's hope was that this publication would revitalise the study of the great house in the eighteenth century. As we leaf through the book on a journey of discovery it is as if he is still present, at our elbow."

== Library ==
In 2004 Cornforth's collection of books was bequeathed to the National Trust and subsequently transferred to the Paul Mellon Centre. Around eight hundred books were added to the Paul Mellon Centre's library and significantly increased the library's holdings of publications on history of the country house, including those in Northern Ireland, and 18th-century decorative arts.

In February 2016, the Paul Mellon Centre held an exhibition entitled John Cornforth: A Passion for Houses: Material on the Georgian Town House from the Cornforth Library Donation which highlighted some of the significant items from John Cornforth's collection.

== Personal life ==
He became a Commander of the Order of the British Empire in 2001. He never married, but kept a convivial flat in Marylebone, and worshipped at the Anglo-Catholic church St Mary's, Bourne Street, near Sloane Square. Amongst his friends were Anne, Countess of Rosse (wife of Michael Parsons, 6th Earl of Rosse), Rupert Alec-Smith, and Gervase Jackson-Stops, David Mlinaric, Wilson Rockefeller and Martin Drury.

Cornforth died from a brain tumour at St John's Hospice in London on 5 May 2004, aged 66.

== Selected works ==
- Attingham Park: Shropshire. London: National Trust, 1970 (with notes on the pictures by St John Gore) OCLC 11329635
- British Embassy, Paris: The house and its works of art. London: Government Art Collection, 1992 (with Mary Beal) ISBN 978-0-95-164681-6 OCLC 35135623 OCLC 1113253594
- Country Houses in Britain, Can They Survive? An independent report. London: Country Life for the British Tourist Authority, 1974 OCLC 490281849
- The Country Houses of England, 1948-1998. London: Constable, 1998 ISBN 978-0-09-479150-3 OCLC 607116348
- The Country Life Picture Book of Country Houses. London: Country Life, 1963 OCLC 935101573
- Early Georgian Interiors. New Haven, Conn.; London: Yale University Press for the Paul Mellon Centre for Studies in British Art, 2004 ISBN 978-0-30-010330-4 OCLC 938151474
- English Country Houses. London: Country Life, 1955, 3 vols (with Christopher Hussey and Oliver Hill) OCLC 604439618
- English Country Houses: Caroline, 1625–1685. London: Country Life, 1966 (with Oliver Hill) ISBN 978-0-90-746278-1 OCLC 612520707
- English Decoration in the 18th Century. London: Barrie & Jenkins, 1974 (with John Fowler) ISBN 978-0-21-420033-5 OCLC 905258952
- English Interiors, 1790–1848: The quest for comfort. London: Barrie & Jenkins, 1978 ISBN 978-0-21-420290-2 OCLC 237023160
- The Inspiration of the Past: Country house taste in the twentieth century; with photographs by Timothy Beddow. Harmondsworth: Viking in association with Country Life, 1985 ISBN 978-0-67-080180-0 OCLC 12511807
- London Interiors: From the archives of Country Life. London: Aurum Press, 2000 ISBN 978-1-85-410668-1 OCLC 78537882
- Queen Elizabeth the Queen Mother at Clarence House. London: Michael Joseph in association with the Royal Collection, 1996 ISBN 978-0-71-814191-2 OCLC 1171912666
- The Search for a Style: Country Life and architecture, 1897–1935. London: André Deutsch in association with Country Life, 1988 ISBN 978-0-23-398327-1 OCLC 496077190 OCLC 851973468
- Sudbury Hall, Derbyshire. London: National Trust, 1980, reprinted 1985 (with C. St. Q. Wall) OCLC 709883746
