= Etchinghill, Staffordshire =

Village in Staffordshire, England

Coordinates: 52.764455°N 1.961125°W

Etchinghill/Etching Hill
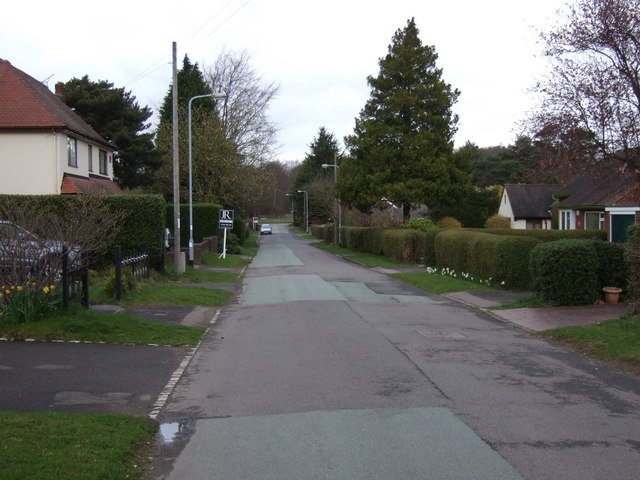
- West Butts Road

- Location within Staffordshire
- OS grid reference: SK027185
- Civil parish: Rugeley
- District: Cannock Chase
- Shire county: Staffordshire
- Region: West Midlands
- Country: England
- Sovereign state: United Kingdom
- Post town: RUGELEY
- Postcode district: WS15
- Dialling code: 01889
- Police: Staffordshire
- Fire: Staffordshire
- Ambulance: West Midlands
- UK Parliament: Cannock Chase

Etchinghill, also known as Etching Hill, is a village in the civil parish of Rugeley in the Cannock Chase District of Staffordshire, England. Etching Hill is situated just over 2 kilometres (1 mi) from Rugeley town centre.

== History ==
Its name historically derives from the large, forested hill on Mount Road - famed for its characteristic ice-age sandstone tip. Etching Hill backs on to Cannock Chase and comprises several housing estates; a recognisable mixture of buildings from the town's early years and numerous modern developments.

== Sports ==
Etching Hill is also the home of Rugeley Cricket and Tennis Clubs, and was also the location of a horse racing course in the 1800s.
